= Funji of Ndongo =

Princess in the Kingdom of Ndongo (around 1500)

Kifunzi of Ndongo (born in the 1500s) also known as Funji or Lady Grace, her sisters, Nzinga of Ndongo and Mukambu of Matamba, were well revered and respected in Kabasa, the capital and the royal home, as well as the rest of Ndongo. Historically, Funji's name can also be seen in documents as "Funje," "Kifunzi," and "Funzi," depending on the time period. Funji was known to be beautiful and often compared to her mother, Batayo.

Being the youngest of the siblings, she was often seen as more full of life, Nzinga remembers times when Funji was smiling and humming, her arms both in the air as though she felt like dancing. She was also clever, both in wit and in aiding with advice to her sisters when Nzinga became the female king. Sources say Funji, much like her sisters, was well educated however may have fallen behind in some studies, especially when being taught by the Portuguese.

== Historical context ==
=== Central African Kingdoms ===
Central Africa is a region of Africa located in the center-most western area of the continent. Many kingdoms thrived in Central Africa. These kingdoms were typically primary or secondary kingdoms. Primary kingdoms gain power by being the only state or society that exists; these kingdoms are located near environmentally rich areas that benefit society. Secondary kingdoms are created by breaking away from the primary kingdom. Secondary kingdoms focus on the value of agriculture and having an abundance of farmland. The Kingdom of Ndongo, located in modern-day Angola, was primary. Ndongo was established in Luanda, Angola which is on the western coast of Africa, and is home to many rivers that lead to the Southern Atlantic Ocean. Politically, African kingdoms often fell into two groups: Group A and Group B. Group A kingdoms are well-structured kingdoms with established governments and a hierarchy according to societal status. Group B kingdoms have no central government and no defined hierarchy. Ndongo was a Group A kingdom, where family bloodlines played a significant role in establishing the hierarchy.

=== Kingdom of Ndongo ===
Ndongo was an African Kingdom established around the 1500s in what is modern day Angola. This historical African kingdom was the kingdom of the Mbundu people. Mbande a Ngola was elected ruler of Ndongo after Kasenda in 1592 and ruled until 1617. He had a chief wife who was the daughter of a provincial ruler. Mbande a Ngola also had numerous concubines and children. His chief wife was the mother of his oldest son. However, with his favorite concubine, Kengela ka Nkombe, he had four children. The eldest of these children was his son, Ngola Mbande. His three daughters consisted of Nzinga, Kambu, and Funji. The oldest of the daughters, Nzinga, was 10 years old when her father Mbande became Ngola.

=== Slave trade ===
One of the earliest forms of slavery was developed in Madagascar. Kingdoms in Madagascar would capture prisoners of war and keep them in captivity until a ransom was paid for their release. Rarely were prisoners killed or kept after their ransom had been paid.

In the 16th century, colonizers began to enter the African continent. The concept of forced labor had begun to gain traction across the globe and the Transatlantic Slave Trade began in the 1500s. The Transatlantic Slave Trade involved the capturing of African peoples and transporting them across the Atlantic Ocean to be used as unpaid workers or "slaves."

=== The Portuguese ===
The Portuguese entered the Kingdom of Ndongo in 1575. Portuguese colonizers took interest in Ndongo because of its proximity to the Central African coast where most ships entered and departed from during the Slave Trade. The Kingdom of Ndongo complied with the Portuguese for many years. The Portuguese took Ndongo citizens as prisoners in return for helping the kingdom expand by providing them with the technology to get around environmental hazards such as waterfalls.

== Notable aspects ==
=== Education ===
Funji was well-educated, but not to the same degree as her sister Nzinga. All of Ngola Mbande's children were sent to be raised and educated by a third-party person until they were ready to return to the kingdom and be of use as diplomats or members of the royal court. It is believed that Funji possessed great conversational skills and could speak Portuguese fluently.

=== Prisoners and spies ===
Funji and her sister Kambu were captured and held as prisoners by the Portuguese twice in their lifetime. The first time the sisters were captured, they were being held to encourage their older, diplomatic sister, Nzinga, to negotiate with the Portuguese and give them what they desired from the Kingdom of Ndongo. Nzinga successfully negotiated their release and they were returned home. A few years later, the sisters were captured again for similar reasons, only this time Nzinga had taken the role of Ngola. The sisters became a sort of Portuguese intelligence or spies for Nzinga and the Kingdom of Ndongo. Funji and Kambu found ways to discreetly send messages to Nzinga about the Portugueses' plans.

== Legacy and death ==
During her time as a captive to the Portuguese, Funji was educated in their ways and religion. Sources say that both Funji and Kambi were sending Nzinga information about the Portuguese moves. Funji was known to have a captain as a lover and had children with him which not only kept her safe but gave her the ability to communicate with Nzinga. Funji was very funny, calm, and beautiful so she had an easy time fitting more into the system the Portuguese wanted.

It is unclear whether Funji made it out of capture and lived with Nzinga in Matamba or not. Without hers and Kambi's help and spy work, Nzinga would not have been able to get a few steps ahead of the Portuguese. Historians debate whether it was Kambi or Funji that was discovered as a spy and drowned by the Portuguese. Some sources say this is the fate that Funji suffered, others say that her lover and children secured her safety and that she was able to die of old age. She leaves behind the legacy of loyalty to family.

Due to her closeness to her sisters, Funji never failed to help support Nzinga in any way she could. Captives by European traders had a hard time holding onto their ideas from their homeland.
