= Kaza ka Ngola =

17th-century Imbangala warlord

- Known for: Imbangala warlord
- Spouse: Queen Nzinga

Kaza ka Ngola, also referred to as Ngola ka Kaza and Kaza ka Ndongo (Jaga Caza in Portuguese) was a 17th-century Imbangala warlord, who married Queen Nzinga, though he later defected her.

The Kaza Imbangala were just one of several Imbangala hordes active in the region that is now Angola in the 16th century. They lived by plunder and were known to engage in cannibalistic rituals. The origins of Kaza and his followers, like all other Imbangala bands, is ultimately obscure, with theories supporting the idea that they either originated in Lunda or the Bié Plateau.

The Portuguese governor of Angola Luís Mendes de Vasconcelos recruited the war-band of Kaza along with two others to assist him in a projected campaign against the Kingdom of Ndongo, which was then at war with Portugal. Kaza converted to Christianity on the occasion, adopting the name João Kaza ka Ngola.

The 1617 campaign against Ndongo was successful but Kaza deserted from the side of Portugal to engage in independent raiding in the region along with another Imbangala band, that of Dongo. He turned on the Portuguese and attacked their stronghold at Ambaca, before finally allying with Ngola Mbandi of Ndongo. The ruler of Ndongo entrusted his young heir to Kaza for military training and safeguarding, because he did not trust Nzinga or any of his sisters. Ngola Mbandi signed a peace with Portugal but died shortly afterwards, and his half-sister Nzinga took over as regent of Ndongo. According to the Portuguese veteran and chronicler António de Oliveira Cardonega, Nzinga feigned love to Kaza in order to get him to hand over her nephew, then had him drowned. She usurped the throne of Ndongo, and violently persecuted anyone who would not accept her authority. This caused a rift in Ndongo between her and the supporters of Hari a Kiluanje.

Hari a Kiluanje met with the Portuguese governor Fernão de Sousa to seek support for his claim to the throne of Ndongo, but when news of this reached Nzinga she had Hari a Kiluanje sieged at his stronghold of Pungo Andongo, in early 1626. Hari a Kiluanje was, however, succoured in time by a Portuguese army under the command of Bento Banha Cardoso, who then marched against Nzinga. Cardoso sieged the islands of Quindonga on the Cuanza which Nzinga had been using as her capital, but when an epidemic broke out she fled south beyond the river to meet with Kaza at his war-camp, while the Portuguese army was unable to pursue due to disease. Hari a Kiluanje fell to the disease and was succeeded by Ngola Hari, who converted to Catholicism and took the name Filipe of Ndongo.

While at the war-camp, Nzinga sought the support of Kaza by marrying him, and obtained the major title of tempaza, reserved to women of high status and which conferred them wide powers in war as well as politics among the Imbangala. They had mutual interests as Kaza was looking for a "first wife" to perform the role of tempaza and the associated rituals. Nzinga sought to present herself as the reincarnation of Tembandumba, a legendary warrior queen said to have established the yijilla or Imbangala laws and rituals. She sealed her alliance with Kaza by performing the same ritual Tembandumba was said to have done, sacrificing an infant using a mortar and pestle and producing the sacred maji a samba ointment from the ground up remains. She sought to raise forces to attack the Portuguese and introduced her Ambundu subjects to Imbangala war-tactics and rituals.

Queen Nzinga lived on the run with Kaza along with the rest of her supporters between 1626 and 1629, frequently relocating to avoid capture by Portuguese forces. When she dispatched an envoy to the Portuguese requesting that the governor Fernão de Sousa annul his support for her rival Filipe, Sousa declared him a spy and had him executed, and this caused the separation of Nzinga and Kaza. Nzinga was eventually forced to flee Ndongo to the Kingdom of Kasanje through the Quina Grande das Ganguelas cliff. Kaza fought the Portuguese but was routed and also forced out of Ndongo. Kaza then moved north with his war-band to engage in raiding.

== See also ==
- Angolan Wars
- History of Angola
- Kingdom of Kasange
- Kabuku ka Ndonga
- Imbe Kalandula
