= Anne of Great Britain =

Anne of Great Britain may refer to:

- Anne, Queen of Great Britain (1665–1714)
- Anne, Princess Royal and Princess of Orange (1709–1759), daughter of King George II of Great Britain
- Anne, Princess Royal (born 1950), daughter of Queen Elizabeth II of the United Kingdom

== See also ==
- Princess Anne (disambiguation)
- Queen Anne (disambiguation)
