= Ann Regina =

Ann, Anne, Anna. Ana, or, variant, Regina; may refer to:

== People ==
- Queen Anne (disambiguation) including Ann, Ana, Anna; for which "Anna Regina" (and "Anna R.") is Latin for "Anne the Queen" with Anne/Ana/Ann in Latin as Anna
  - Anne Regina is Latin for "Anne the Queen". In Britain, this (and "Anne R.") was used by Anne, Queen of Great Britain
- Anne Régina Badet (1876–1949), French actress
- Ana Regina Cuarón, a Mexican actress-singer on Regina: Un Musical Para Una Nación Que Despierta musical play and album
- Sister Anne Regina Ennis (19th century), who re-founded the Altoona Sisters of Charity of Seton Hill as a separate entity from its original 1870 founding as a branch
- Dr. Anne Regina Douglas (21st century), who received an OBE at the 2012 Birthday Honours
- Ana Regina Quiñónez, high jump national record holder (set in 1991) for Guatemala; see List of Guatemalan records in athletics
- Anna Regina Studer (died 1876), daughter of U.S. artist Jacob H. Studer
- Anna Regina Svensson-Jacobsen (19th century), wife of Stillman Pond
- Anna-Regina Szternfinkiel (1920–1966), Polish-French author
- Anna Regina Tychsen (1853–1896), German-Danish ballet dancer

=== Fictional characters ===
- Ana Regina Rocio, a character from the Mexican telenovela Como dice el dicho, played by Lupita Jones in 2015

== Places ==
- Anna Regina is the capital of the Pomeroon-Supenaam Region of Guyana
- Anna Regina Secondary School, Anna Regina, Pomeroon-Supenaam, Essequibo Coast, Guyana

== Other uses ==
- "Anna Regina" (Wolf Hall), a 2015 series 1 episode 3 of the TV show Wolf Hall

== See also ==
- Regina (disambiguation)
- Anna (disambiguation)
- Anne (disambiguation)
- Ann (disambiguation)
- Ana (disambiguation)
