= Battle of Kombi =

1647 battle

- Part of the Dutch–Portuguese War and the Angolan Wars
- A map of the Kingdom of Ndongo
Date	29 October 1647
Location	Massangano, Angola
Result	Allied victory

Belligerents
Dutch Republic; Kingdom of Kongo; Matamba	Portugal

Commanders and leaders
Nzinga; Cristóvão Corte-Real	Gaspar Borges Madureira †

Strength
8,000 Ambundu archers 400 Dutch soldiers	30,000 African archers 600 Portuguese and Luso-African soldiers

Casualties and losses
Unknown	3,000 killed or wounded

The Battle of Kombi was a major battle of the Angolan Wars, in the war between Queen Nzinga and Portugal during the Dutch period of Angolan history.

== Background ==
When the Dutch forces occupied Luanda in 1641, the capital of the Portuguese colony of Angola, the neighbouring countries of Kongo and Ndongo had welcomed them, sending embassies and receiving promises of assistance in driving the Portuguese out of the colony and central Africa. However, following the initial Dutch success, the Portuguese had fallen back into their interior positions, first at Bengo, where they were driven out, and then to the Fort Nossa Senhora da Vitória at Massangano. In 1643, deciding it was not worthwhile to continue the war with Portugal, the Dutch signed an agreement which effectively left Portugal in command of the interior presidios. However, the kingdom of Ndongo, a longtime enemy of Portuguese ambitions, then led by Queen Njinga fought on against the Portuguese without Dutch help. Following her defeat at the Battle of Kavanga in 1646, however, the situation was sufficiently grave that the Dutch commander decided to commit forces to her support.

The Portuguese governor of Angola Francisco de Souto Maior died shortly after Kavanga, and he was replaced by an interim council led by Bartolomeu de Vasconcelos da Cunha, António de Teixeira de Mendonça and João Zuzarte de Andrade, who quarreled constantly however. The Portuguese noticed an unsual level of troop movement in the region of Ilamba, around Luanda, whose chiefs loyal to the Dutch continuously skirmished with those loyal to Portugal. Fearing that the loyalty of these sobas was at risk and that the Dutch were preparing to make a move, the Portuguese decided to launch a preemptive attack, and dispatched captain-major Gaspar Borges Madureira ahead of a force of Portuguese and African auxiliaries, which included a number of Imbangala detachments.

Madureira believed that his presence would suffice to end the conflict between rival sobas in Ilamba, and he camped in the lands of soba Cadungo. Queen Nzinga marched out against him with her lieutenant, Nzinga Amona, while the king of Kongo dispatched an army commanded by Dom Cristóvão Corte-Real to aid her. The Dutch also marched out with a contingent of soldiers.

Thus, in 1647 a combined force from Kongo, Ndongo, and a Dutch contingent of 400-500 soldiers, adding to over 8,000 men, met the Portuguese and their African allies with a field army of some 30,000 soldiers, including 600 Portuguese and Luso-Africans, somewhere north of Massangano (the battlefield has not yet been located).

The sobas of Ilamba were divided, but they allowed Nzinga to pass with her forces through their lands unopposed, and so the Portuguese were caught by surprise in their camp. Gaspar Borges Madureira was killed in combat, as were his officers and a number of auxiliary chiefs.

The Portuguese and their allies were routed by the Dutch and their allied Africans and over 3,000 men of the Portuguese army were killed or wounded.

As a result of this victory, almost all the sobas loyal to Portugal defected and only the soba of Cambambe and Angola Quilongola, on whose lands Massangano stood, remained firm in their allegiance. The lord of Cambambe marched out to Massangano with his warriors to help defend the stronghold from a possible attack by the Dutch or Queen Nzinga. King Filipe of Ndongo also remained loyal and he also reinforced Massangano in person with his forces.

Nzinga and her army attempted to lay siege to three of the Portuguese presidios in Angola, Ambaca, Massangano and Muxima. These sieges were not successful, largely because neither she nor her Dutch allies possessed sufficient artillery to conduct an attack, even though the number of the Portuguese did not exceed 300. When the forces of Salvador de Sá e Benevides arrived in 1648, Njinga was forced to abandon the siege and return to her headquarters in Matamba.

== See also ==
- Angolan Wars
- Dutch Loango-Angola

== Sources ==
- António Oliveira de Cadornega, História geral das guerras angolanas (1680) 3 vols. Lisbon: Agencia geral do Ultramar, 1940-42 (reprinted 1972)
- Anonymous, "Extract van seekeren brief, gheschreven uyt Loando..." in S. P. L'Honoré Naber, "Nota van Pieter Moortamer over het gewest Angola..." Bijdragen en Medeelingen van het Historisch Genootschap 54 (1933): 41-42.
