= Battle of Kavanga =

- Part of the Angolan Wars
Date	March 1646
Location	Kavanga, Angola
Result	Portuguese victory.

Belligerents
Portugal; Kingdom of Ndongo	Kingdom of Matamba

Commanders and leaders
(Portugal) Gaspar Borges Madureira	Queen Nzinga

Strength
16 horsemen 330 infantrymen 20,000 auxiliaries	Unknown

Casualties and losses
Unknown	2000 dead.

The battle of Kavanga, known as Battle of Xila in Portuguese-speaking countries, was an armed confrontation struck on an unrecorded day of March 1646, between the forces of the Portuguese Empire and those of Queen Nzinga, supported by some troops of the Dutch West India Company. The Portuguese were victorious.

== Context ==
Paulo Dias de Novais established the city of Luanda in Angola in 1576, but the Portuguese had been at war with Queen Nzinga since 1626. After Dutch West India Company captured Luanda in August 23 1641, when Portugal was no longer part of the Iberian Union and no longer hostile towards the Dutch Republic, governor Pedro César de Meneses ordered the evacuation of all residents to the stronghold of Massangano further inland. From that point onwards, the Dutch made an alliance with Queen Nzinga and the Kingdom of Kongo. The Portuguese came under attack from all sides, cut-off from the sea and though reduced to dire straits, the Portuguese still had the support of a number of regional allies, chief among them king Filipe de Sousa of Ndongo, who contested Queen Nzingas claim to the throne of Ndongo. At Massangano, "headquarters of this extraordinary epic, the burning flame still flickered: against it, the adverse winds of the treacheries of the Flemings, the ambushes of the gentiles, and the deathly unsanitaryness of the swamps surrounding the stronghold still blew against it, without managing to snuff it."

Meneses was succeeded by Francisco de Souto-Maior in October 1645. To elude Dutch vigilance he disembarked at Suto near Cabo Ledo and marched inland with his forces divided in three detachments. He reached Massangano with considerable reinforcements, and was received in triumph. The first campaign during his term would be directed against Queen Nzinga.

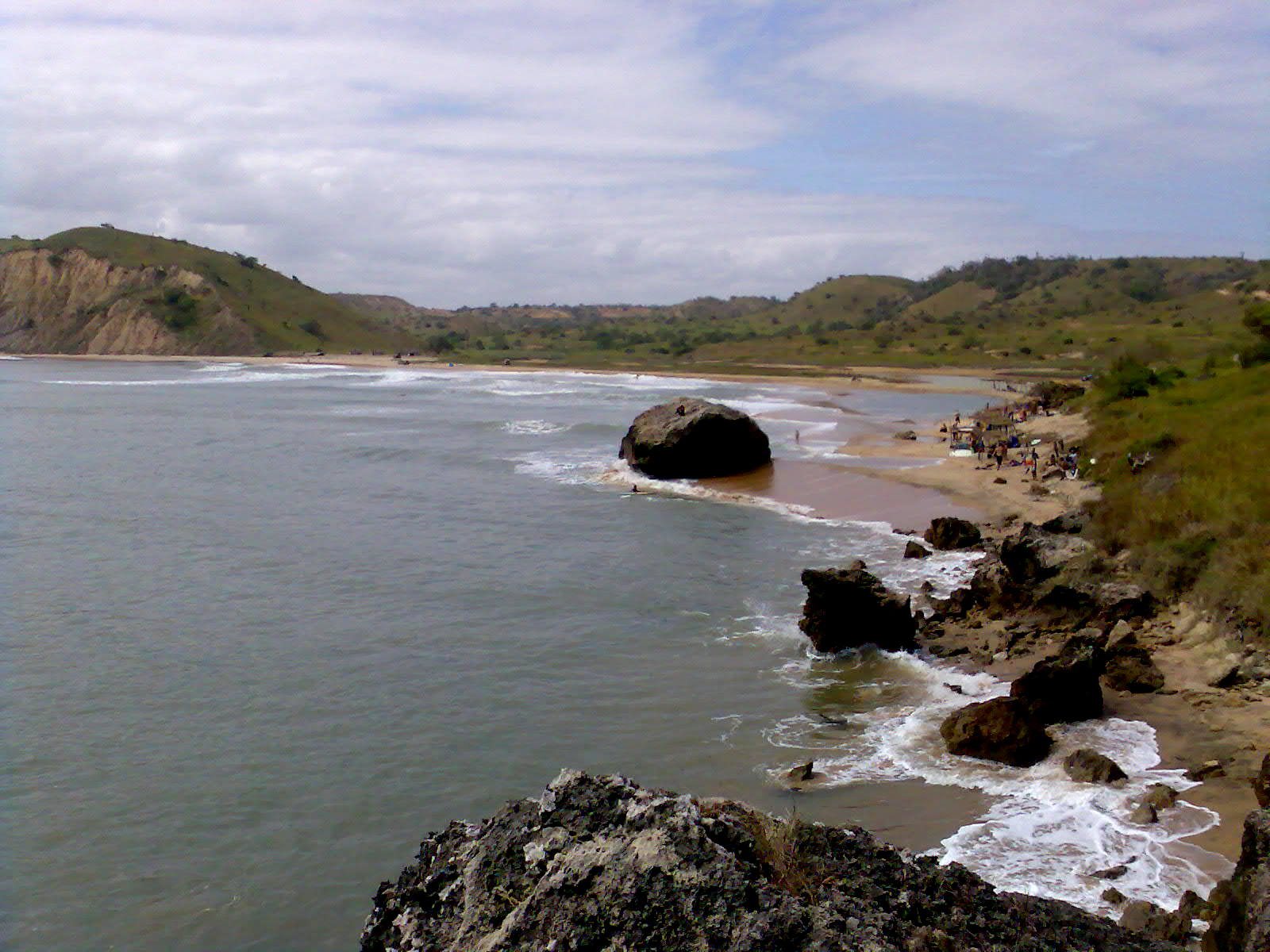
Cabo Ledo in Bengo Province, Angola.

Sometime between October 1645 and March 1646, Queen Nzinga had a small force commanded by Gaspar Aquibuata raid a village near Ambaca. The fire and smoke rising from the village could be seen from Ambaca, and captain-major Gaspar Borges Madureira summoned the troops with a mucucu, or traditional African war-rattle used in emergency situations. Soldiers, officers, African auxiliaries, Imbangala mercenaries and Portuguese vassals, marched out under the command of Madureira, and they reached the river Bengo by dawn.

Scouts sighted the enemy on the opposite banks. They were found to be preparing to consume both the captured cattle as well as the war-prisoners. A speedy Portuguese surprise attack succeeded in nearly annihilating that force, with Gaspar Aquibuata being killed in the action. The scouts then reported that Queen Nzingas quilombo or war-camp was just beyond the Bengo,so Madureira crossed it and marched north. She had stationed her war-camp at Sengas de Kavanga.

=== The battle of Kavanga ===
Portuguese naval and war-banner with the Cross of the Order of Christ.

Queen Nzinga was informed of the rout of Gaspar Aquibuata by its few survivors who managed to return to camp, but the queen had them executed for failing to die in combat like their comrades. Nzinga then ordered attacks on the subjects of king Filipe of Ndongo and invited the Dutch for a joint campaign against the Portuguese. The Dutch had recently scored a successful attack on the Portuguese and accepted.

Meanwhile, governor Souto-Maior sought to prevent Queen Nzinga and the Dutch from linking up their forces. After the Dutch had broken truces once more by capturing a Portuguese patache and killing its captain, the governor declared war on March 1646. He was quoted as saying that "I do not fear all the power of Holland! The Fleming shall fear me!" A force was dispatched to link up with Madureira and they camped at Xila, where they were soon joined by Madureiras men, along with warriors of the king of Ndongo Filipe de Sousa.

The Portuguese army numbered 16 horsemen, 330 Portuguese infantrymen and over 20,000 African auxiliaries, among which were Ambundu bowmen led by king Filipe de Sousa, and Imbangala warriors led by the warlord Cabuco, plus a unit of empacasseiros or buffalo-hunters armed with guns. A great fire broke out in the camp in the middle of the night, and the troops were forced to relocate before dawn.

The Portuguese troops made a perilous crossing of the Dande. Battle was met by 9 AM. Queen Nzinga accompanied the army in person, though the command of the troops was delegated to her second-in-command, Nzinga Amona. Madureira was able to see from a hill the queen, protected by a parasol and guarded by six Dutch soldiers, in the middle of a battalion of men. Her harmy was reinforced by the sobas Ifamuto and Kakulo-ka-Kaenda.

The forces of Queen Nzinga advanced first against the Portuguese army, but they were repulsed by the artillery, the queen herself having been forced to withdraw. The Portuguese left flank and rear-guard, where the forces of king Filipe of Ndongo were stationed at, bore the brunt of the assault. Queen Nzingas lieutenant was killed in the fighting, and soon her army retreated in a rout. The battle ended at 2 p.m as a crushing Portuguese victory. They then looted the war-camp of Queen Nzinga, where considerable spoils were taken.

The Portuguese captured significant numbers of prisoners, though the queen herself managed to avoid capture once more. Among them were the queens own sister, Kambo and Kakulo-ka-Kaenda, who was beheaded. Despite this defeat, Queen Nzinga rejected peace negotiations. She retreated to Matamba to rebuild her forces and incited the tribes in Dembos to attack the Portuguese.

Governor Souto-Maior was afflicted by an unknown disease at Massangano and perished shortly after the battle of Kavanga. He was replaced with an elected council led by Bartolomeu de Vasconcelos da Cunha, António de Teixeira de Mendonça and João Zuzarte de Andrade. Supplies at Massangano by then ran low, and so António Teixeira de Mendonça led a force to the Bengo in order to open up a pathway to the sea, but they were repulsed by the Dutch at a battle fought near the Lucala.

== See also ==
- Dutch Loango-Angola
- Portuguese Angola
- Recapture of Angola
