= Filipe of Ndongo =

Dom Filipe de Sousa of Ndongo, also known as Ngola Hari, was a 17th-century ruler of the kingdom of Ndongo, and an ally or vassal of Portugal. He ruled out of the Black Rocks of Pungo Andongo.

Ngola Hari was the brother of Hari a Kiluanje, who had long claimed the throne of Ndongo. Power in Ndongo was usurped by Queen Nzinga after the death of king Ngola Mbandi, whose heir was murdered on orders of Nzinga. Nzingas rule was controversial as she was not of royal lineage. When Hari a Kiluanje opened talks with the Portuguese at Luanda, the Queen promptly sieged Pungo Andongo, sparking civil war. Portugal supported Hari a Kiluanje. They marched on Ndongo gathering the submission of all Ndongo lords in favour of the lord of Hari and threw out Nzinga with her supporters, but Hari a Kiluanje then died in an epidemic.

Ngola Hari was therefore crowned king of Ndongo by the Portuguese governor of Angola Fernão de Sousa on On October 12, 1626. Ngola Hari converted to Catholicism the following year on October 27 and adopted the name Filipe de Sousa, in honour of both king Phillip IV, who also ruled Portugal, as well as governor Fernão de Sousa.

King Filipe was Queen Nzingas main rival and became Portugal's most resolute ally in Angola until his death in 1664, consistently supporting the Portuguese with auxiliary Ambundu warriors, whom he led personally. His help was vital after Luanda had been captured by the Dutch West India Company and the Portuguese were confined to the interior, almost completely surrounded by enemies and cut off from the sea. He participated in the Battle of Kavanga alongside the Portuguese against Queen Nzinga. After the Battle of Kombi in which the Portuguese were routed by Dutch, Kongo and Ambundu forces led by Queen Nzinga, king Filipe personally reinforced the Portuguese stronghold of Massangano to help defend it against a possible siege. He was succeeded by João Hari.

== See also ==
- Angolan Wars
- Queen Nzinga
