= Queen Anne =

Queen Anne, Ann, or Anna may refer to:

== Related to Anne, queen regnant of Great Britain ==
- Anne, Queen of Great Britain (1665–1714), queen of England and Scotland (1702–1707), Ireland (1702–1714) and of Great Britain (1707–1714)
  - Queen Anne style architecture, an architectural style from her reign, and its revivals
  - Queen Anne style furniture
  - Queen Anne (play), a 2015 play on Anne's life
  - Queen Anne's War during her reign
  - MS Queen Anne Ship named after the Monarch

== Other queens called Anne, Ann or Anna ==
- Anne of Kiev (c. 1024–1075), queen of France
- Anne of Bohemia (1290–1313), queen of Bohemia
- Anne of Bavaria (1329–1353), queen of Germany and Bohemia
- Anna von Schweidnitz (1339–1362), queen of Germany and Bohemia
- Anne of Bohemia (1366–1394), queen of England
- Anne Neville (1456–1485), queen of England
- Anne of Brittany (1477–1514), queen of France
- Anne of Foix-Candale (1484–1506), queen of Hungary and Bohemia
- Anne Boleyn (1501/7–1536), queen of England
- Anne of Bohemia and Hungary (1503–1547), queen of Hungary, Germany and Bohemia
- Anne of Cleves (1515–1557), queen of England
- Anna Jagiellon (1523–1596), queen of Poland
- Anna of Austria, Queen of Spain (1549–1580), queen of Spain and Portugal
- Anne of Austria, Queen of Poland (1573–1598), queen of Poland and Sweden
- Anne of Denmark (1574–1619), queen of Scotland and England
- Anne Catherine of Brandenburg (1575–1612), queen of Denmark and Norway
- Nzinga of Ndongo and Matamba (c. 1583–1663), queen of Ndongo and Matamba, also known by her Christian name, Anna
- Anna of Tyrol (1585–1618), queen of Germany, Hungary and Bohemia
- Anne of Austria (1601–1666), queen of France
- Queen Ann (Pamunkey chief) (c. 1650–c. 1725), Native American tribal leader in colonial Virginia
- Maria Anna of Neuburg (1667–1740), queen of Spain
- Anne Marie d'Orléans (1669–1728), queen of Sardinia
- Anna of Russia (1730–1740), empress of Russia
- Maria Anna of Austria (1683–1754), queen of Portugal
- Anne Sophie Reventlow (1693–1743), queen of Denmark and Norway
- Anna Pavlovna of Russia (1795–1865), queen of the Netherlands
- Maria Anna of Savoy (1803–1884), queen of Hungary
- Anne of Bourbon-Parma (1923–2016), titular queen of Romania
- Anne-Marie of Denmark (born 1946), queen of the Hellenes

== Places ==
- Queen Anne, Maryland, USA; on Maryland's Eastern Shore
- Queen Anne, Prince George's County, Maryland, USA; census-designated place on the Patuxent River
- Queen Anne's County, Maryland, USA
- Queen Anne, Seattle, Washington, USA

== Other uses ==
- Anna (Frozen), a character from Disney's Frozen

== See also ==
- Queen Anne-Marie of Greece (born 1946), queen of Greece
- Keran, Queen of Armenia (before 1262–1285)
- Queen Anne style (disambiguation)
- Ann Regina (disambiguation); Latin for "Ann the Queen"; including Anne, Anna, Ana
- Princess Anne (disambiguation)
- Anne (disambiguation)
