= Mariana Victoria =

Mariana Victoria may refer to:

- Mariana Victoria of Spain (1718–1781), eldest daughter of Philip V of Spain; Queen of Portugal from 1750 until 1777.
- Mariana Victoria of Portugal (1768–1788), granddaughter of previous; only daughter of Queen Maria I and Peter III; Infanta of Spain by marriage.

== See also ==
- Maria Anna Victoria of Bavaria (1660–1690), elder daughter of Max Emmanuel II; Dauphine of France by marriage.
- Princess Maria Anna Victoria of Savoy (1686–1763), daughter of Prince Louis Thomas of Savoy-Carignano; Princess of Saxe-Hilburghausen by marriage.
- Princess Maria
- Princess Anna
- Princess Victoria
