= Anne (disambiguation) =

Anne is a feminine (sometimes masculine) given name.

Anne may also refer to:

== Arts and entertainment ==
- "Anne" (Buffy the Vampire Slayer episode), 1998
- Anne (Little Britain), a character in Little Britain
- Anne (British TV series), a 2022 British miniseries about activist Anne Williams
- Anne (Turkish TV series), 2016–2017
- Anne with an E (titled Anne for its first season), a 2017 Canadian television series based on the novel Anne of Green Gables

== Ships ==
- Ann (ship), a list of ships named Ann or Anne
- HMS Anne, several ships of the Royal Navy

== Other ==
- Anne, Estonia, village in Antsla Parish Võru County, Estonia
- Anne (band), an American dream pop band
- Anne (novel), by Constance Fenimore Woolson, 1880
- "Anne", a song by Kayak from the 1980 album Periscope Life

== See also ==
- , including many people with forename Anne
- Anastasia
- Anna (disambiguation)
- Anneliese
- Annie (disambiguation)
- Anni (disambiguation)
- Ann (disambiguation)
- Anya
- Princess Anne (disambiguation)
- Queen Anne (disambiguation)
- Saint Anne (disambiguation)
