= Princess Anne (disambiguation) =

Princess Anne (born 1950) is the daughter of Queen Elizabeth II and Prince Philip, Duke of Edinburgh.

Princess Anne may also refer to:

== British royalty ==
- Anne Hyde (1637–1671), Duchess of York as daughter-in-law of Charles I
- Anne Neville (1456–1485), Princess of Wales (1470–1471) as daughter-in-law of Henry VI
- Anne of York (daughter of Edward IV) (1475–1511)
- Anne Stuart (1637–1640), daughter of Charles I
- Anne, Princess Royal and Princess of Orange (1709–1759), daughter of George II
- Anne, Queen of Great Britain (1665–1714), daughter of James II, known as Princess Anne of Denmark between marriage and accession to the throne

== Danish royalty ==
See Princess Anne of Denmark (disambiguation)

== Royalty of other countries ==
- Princess Anne Charlotte of Lorraine (1714–1773)
- Princess Anne of Löwenstein-Wertheim-Freudenberg (1864–1927)
- Princess Anne de Bauffremont-Courtenay (1919–1945)
- Princess Anne of Orléans (1906–1986)
- Princess Anne, Duchess of Calabria (born 1938)

== Places ==
- Princess Anne County, Virginia, now extinct
- Princess Anne, Maryland, US
- Princess Anne, Virginia, US, formerly known as Princess Anne County before incorporating as a city

== Transportation ==
- 46202 Princess Anne, a steam locomotive
- GH-2007 Princess Anne, a Mountbatten class hovercraft
- SS Princess Anne, a steam ferry built in 1936 for service on Chesapeake Bay, Virginia

== Other uses ==
- Princess Anne High School, Virginia Beach, Virginia

== See also ==
- Princess Anna (disambiguation)
- Anna of Austria (disambiguation)
- Queen Anne (disambiguation)
