= Kingdom of Ndongo =

State on the Atlantic coast of Central Africa from 1518 to 1683

Kingdom of Ndongo Dongo, Andongo
- 1518–1683
- Flags according to Giovanni Cavazzi da Montecuccolo, 1650s

- Status: Sovereign kingdom
- Capital: Kabasa
- Common languages: Kimbundu
- Religion: Bukongo; Catholicism; Antonianism
- History
  - Established: 1518
  - The war against the Kingdom of Kongo: 1556
  - Battle of Kombi: 1647
  - The signing of a treaty between Queen Nzhinga and the Kingdom of Portugal: 1657
  - Portugal's colonization of Ndongo: 1683
Succeeded by
Portuguese Angola
- Today part of: Angola

The Kingdom of Ndongo (formerly known as Angola or Dongo, also Kimbundu: Utuminu ua Ndongo, Utuminu ua Ngola) was an early-modern African state located in the highlands between the Lukala and Kwanza Rivers, in what is now Angola.

The Kingdom of Ndongo is first recorded in the sixteenth century. It was one of multiple vassal states to Kongo, though Ndongo was the most powerful of these with a king called the Ngola.

Little is known of the kingdom in the early sixteenth century. "Angola" was listed among the titles of the King of Kongo in 1535, so it was likely somewhat subordinate to Kongo. Its oral traditions, collected in the late sixteenth century, particularly by the Jesuit Baltasar Barreira, described the founder of the kingdom, Ngola Kiluanje, also known as Ngola Inene, as a migrant from Kongo, chief of a Kimbundu-speaking ethnic group.

== Political structure ==
The Kimbundu-speaking region was known as the land of Mbundu people. It was ruled by a Ngola, or king, who lived with his extended family in the capitol, or kabasa. The kingdom was divided into political territories that were independently ruled by sobas, or nobles. These sobas governed territories (called murinda) and paid tribute to the Ngola, as well as fighting for the kingdom during a war. Ndongo's internal wars sometimes resulted in alliances forming between sobas, which combined murindas and created large provinces, or kandas.

The Ngola of Ndongo and his sobas relied on other officials to carry out his orders. The most important position was that of tendala, a chief advisor with the authority to rule in the Ngola's absence. He also managed much of his day-to-day duties. A tendala was usually a former captive chosen from the class of enslaved serfs called kijikos. Below the tendala was the military commander, called ngolambole, who was also a former member of the kijikos class.

The Ngola also had a large group of bureaucrats, called the makotas, or "the gentlemen of the land," who helped manage the capitol and advise the Ngola on important decisions for the kingdom. They included the mwene lumbo, who managed the palace; the mwene kudya, who managed the food and monetary taxes; the mwene miste, who managed religious affairs; and the mwene ndongo, who was the great priest. The king also took advice from a nganga marinda, a spiritual leader believed to have a supernatural connection to the ancestors.

Titles of nobility also existed within the political system of the Kingdom of Ndongo. The court was called the o-mbala, while the title of the chieftain was referred to as se-kulu, meaning "old father" in the Mbundu language. Similar to Westerner nobility, there was also a count called a di-kanda, a duke was called a mvunda, and a baron was called a mbanza.

Larger kingdoms may have emerged earlier, but in the sixteenth century, most of these regions had been united by the rulers of Ndongo. Ndongo's capital city was called Kabasa (Caculo Cabaça), located on the highlands near modern-day N'dalatando. This was a large town, holding as many as 50,000 people in its densely populated district.

== History ==
=== Rise of Ndongo ===
The Mbundu people founded the Kingdom of Ndongo under a king of the Ngola dynasty, using their artisan, blacksmithing, and agricultural skills to become influential traders in the region. They established massive farming communities, created unity through the veneration of zumbi (ancestors) and ilundu (deities), and organized military strategies to fortify their borders and protect their people.

==== Seeds of independence ====
In 1518, Ngola Kiluanji of the Kingdom of Ndongo sent ambassadors to Portugal, requesting that Catholic priests visit his kingdom to learn more about Europeans. A Portuguese mission arrived in Ndongo in 1520, but local disputes and perhaps Kongo pressure forced the missionaries to withdraw. Afonso I of Kongo took the missionaries to Kongo and left his priest in Ndongo.

==== War of 1556 ====
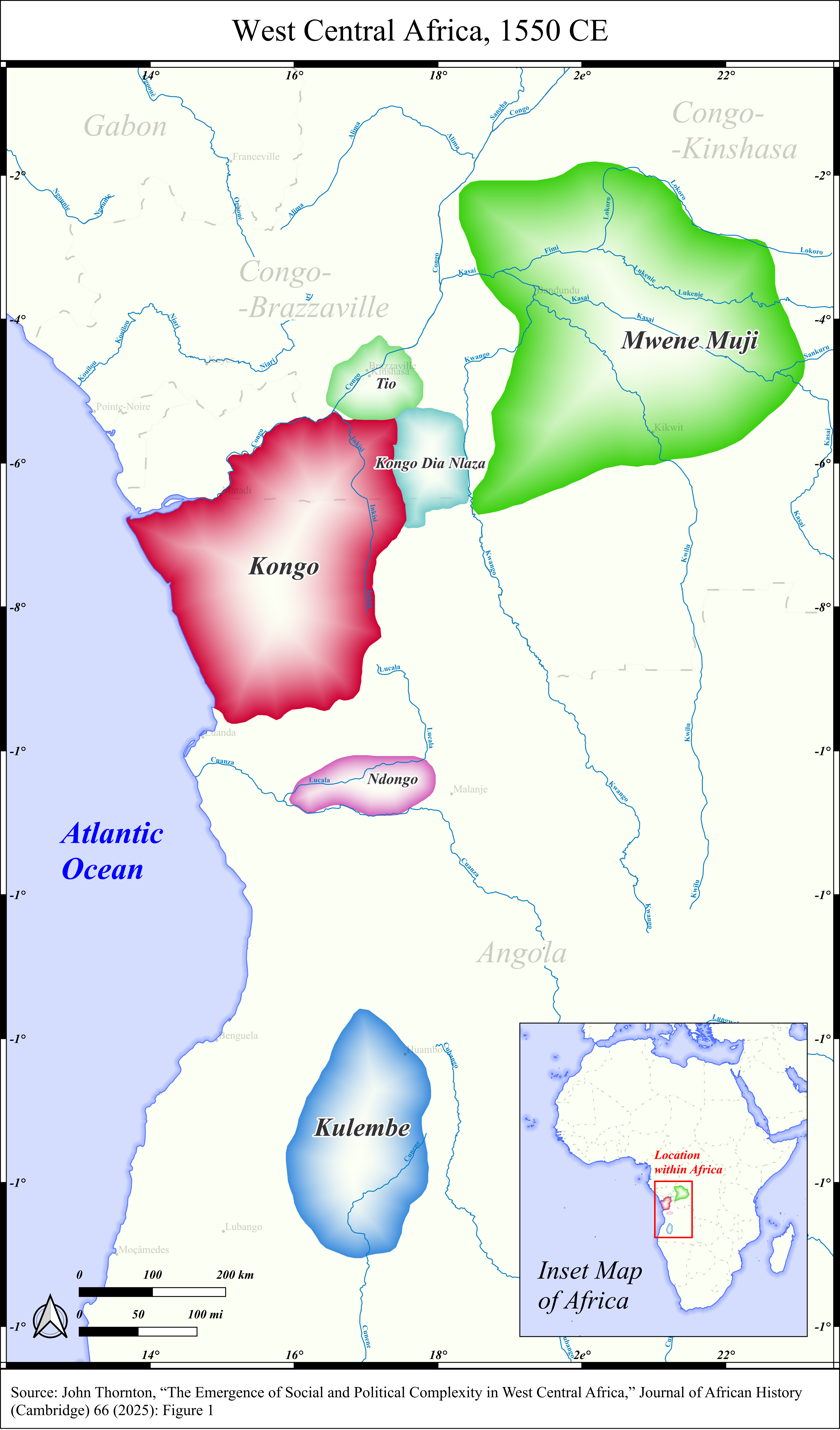
Major states of the western Congo Basin, c. 1550

Around 1556, Ndongo sent another mission to Portugal seeking military assistance and offering to be baptized, even though Portuguese officials were unsure of the religious sincerity at the time. In 1901, historian E.G. Ravenstein claimed that this mission was the result of a war between Kongo and Ndongo, in which Ndongo won and declared its independence, which was also claimed by historian Jan Vansina in 1966 and then others, but this appears to have been a misreading of the sources. Ndongo may have seen the mission as a declaration of independence since Kongo's response to the 1518 mission suggests that it still maintained sufficient control to prevent it from being an independent move.

The second Portuguese mission arrived at the mouth of the Cuanza River in 1560, headed by Paulo Dias de Novais, grandson of the famous explorer Bartolomeu Dias, and including several Jesuit priests including Francisco de Gouveia. This mission also failed, and Dias de Novais returned to Portugal in 1564, leaving Gouveia behind.

=== The Portuguese colony of Angola ===
By the time of the third mission in 1571, the King of Portugal Sebastian I had decided to charge Dias de Novais with the conquest and subjugation of the "Kingdom of Angola", authorizing him to govern the region, bring in settlers, and build forts. Dias de Novais arrived in Luanda by arrangement with Kongo's king Álvaro I in compensation for Portugal's assistance against the Jaga. Quilongo, the king of Angola, renewed the connection with Portugal in 1578. Unable to conquer any territory on his own, Dias de Novais made alliances with both Kongo and Ndongo, serving as a mercenary army.

=== The First Portuguese-Ndongo War ===
In 1579, Portuguese merchants who had settled in Kongo, led by Francisco Barbuda, advised Njinga Ndambi Kilombo kia Kasenda that Portugal intended to take over his country. Acting on this intelligence and advice, Njinga Ndambi tricked the Portuguese forces into an ambush and massacred them at his capital.

The following war witnessed a Kongo invasion, which was narrowly defeated in 1580, and a Portuguese offensive up the Kwanza River, resulting in the founding of their fort at Massangano in 1582. Several sobas switched their allegiance to Portugal, and many of the coastal provinces soon joined the colony. By 1590, the Portuguese decided to attack the core of Ndongo and sent an army against Kabasa itself. Ndongo, however, had recently sealed an alliance with nearby Matamba, and the Portuguese force was crushed. Following this defeat, Ndongo made a counteroffensive, and many of the formerly pro-Portuguese sobas returned to Ndongo. But Portugal managed to retain much of the land they had gained in the earlier wars, and in 1599, Portugal and Ndongo formalized their border.

=== The Imbangala period ===
During the early seventeenth century, an uneasy peace was held between Portugal and Ndongo. The Portuguese continued their expansion along the Kwanza, founding the presidio of Cambambe in 1602 and attempted, whenever possible, to meddle in Ndongo's politics, especially as it concerned Ndongo's tenuous hold on Kisama and other lands south of the Kwanza River. During their activities in the region south of the Kwanza, the Portuguese came into contact with the Imbangala, a rootless group of nomadic raiders ravaging the country. In 1615, the temporary Angolan governor Bento Banha Cardoso encouraged some Imbangala to cross the river and enter Portuguese service, and with their help, he expanded the colony along the Lukala River, north of Ndongo.

In 1617, the new governor Luis Mendes de Vasconcelos, after first rejecting the use of Imbangala troops, committed himself to the alliance and began aggressive campaigns against Ndongo. Thanks to the help of Imbangala bands commanded by Kasanje, Kasa, and others, he invaded Ndongo, sacked the capital, and forced Ngola Mbandi to take refuge on the island of Kindonga in the Kwanza River. Thousands of Ndongo subjects were taken prisoner, and Mendes de Vasconcelos sought unsuccessfully to create a puppet government to allow Portuguese rule.

Mendes de Vasconcelos' successor, João Correia de Sousa, tried to make peace with Ndongo. In 1621, Ngola Mbandi sent his sister, Nzinga Mbandi to Luanda to negotiate. She negotiated a peace treaty in which Portugal agreed to withdraw its advance fort of Ambaca on the Lukala, which had served as a base for the invasion of Ndongo, return a large number of captive ijiko to Ndongo, and force the Imbangala bands who were still ravaging Ndongo to leave. In exchange, Ngola Mbandi would leave the island, reestablish himself at the capital, and become a Portuguese vassal, paying 100 enslaved people per year as tribute.

However, João Correia de Sousa became involved in a disastrous war with Kongo and, in the aftermath, was expelled from the colony by angry citizens. His temporary successor, the bishop, was unable to execute the treaty, and it was then left to the new governor, Fernão de Sousa, to settle matters when he came in 1624.

=== The rise of Queen Nzinga ===
Portugal's failure to honor its treaty took a toll on Ngola Mbandi. In desperation, he committed suicide, leaving the country in the hands of his sister Nzinga, who was to serve as regent for his minor son, then in the protective custody of the Imbangala leader Kaza, who had left Portuguese service and joined with Ndongo. Nzinga, however, only briefly served as regent and had the young son murdered and succeeded to the throne as ruling queen. Some European sources call her Anna Xinga.

Father Giovanni took this opportunity to reopen negotiations with Nzinga, whose legitimacy he questioned. He refused to return the Ijiko and insisted that Njinga first acknowledge Portuguese sovereignty. Although Nzinga was prepared to do this, she would not leave the island until her complete control was established and the Ijiko returned. When the Portuguese refused, Nzinga encouraged them to run away and enter her service. The dispute over the Ijiko led to war in 1626. Sousa's army was able to oust Nzinga from Kidonga but not to capture her.

Sousa felt confident enough at this point to declare Nzinga deposed and convened some sobas who had supported her to re-elect as new king Hari a Kiluanji, lord of the rocky fortress of Mpungo a Ndongo (or Pungo Andongo) in 1626. Still, he died in the smallpox epidemic that broke out as a result of the war and was replaced by Filipe Hari a Ngola.

Nzinga refused to recognize Hari a Ngola, claiming that he was of slave origin and not eligible to reign. She reoccupied Kindonga and began mobilizing the support of all the sobas opposed to Hari an Angola and Portuguese rule, leading to a second war with Portugal. Sousa's army defeated Nzinga again in 1628, forcing her to flee the islands. Nzinga narrowly escaped capture, at one point having to descend into the Baixa de Cassange on ropes with only a few hundred of her followers remaining.

Desperate, Nzinga joined forces with the Imbangala band of Kasanje, who forced her to accept a humiliating position as wife and give up her royal regalia. Nevertheless, she was able to win one of his supporters, subsequently known as Nzinga Mona (or Nzinga's son), away and rebuild her army. Using this support, Nzinga moved northward and captured the Kingdom of Matamba, which became her base, even as she sent a detachment to reoccupy the Kindonga Islands, now sacred because her brother's remains were buried there.

At this point, the history of Nzinga becomes that of Matamba, and her career can be followed in that country.

=== Ndongo under Filipe Hari a Ndongo's dynasty ===
Map of Portuguese Angola

Filipe I served the Portuguese loyally in the following decades, even when the Portuguese made a separate peace with Nzinga in 1639. His troops were the most significant component of the army the Portuguese used to make conquests and consolidate their rule in the Dembos area to the north. When the Dutch invaded Brazil, Filipe served against them, forming the bulk of the forces that defended the rump colony at Masangano, though he suffered a crushing defeat at the hands of Nzinga's army with its Dutch allies in 1647 at the Battle of Kombi.

Following the expulsion of the Dutch, however, Filipe began to feel that the Portuguese were not giving him his full due. He became involved in disputes with them over his subordinates and jurisdiction, even as his forces marched into disastrous wars in Kisama and the Dembos. His son and successor was equally disappointed, especially following the Portuguese treaty with Ndongo, which recognized Nzinga as queen of Ndongo and Matamba in 1657, leaving him feeling dishonored as the only ruler of Pungo a Ndongo. Therefore, in 1670, he revolted, and after a long siege, his fortress fell to the Portuguese army in 1671, thus effectively ending Ndongo as an independent kingdom.

== Military ==
The Ndongo army did not rely on arms such as shields for defense. Instead, its personnel were trained to be agile to dodge arrows, javelins, and lance thrusts. On offense, the army was trained in fencing. This Central African martial arts was referred to as Sanguar. It was described by a Jesuit witness in the 1570s as;

all their defense consists of sanguar which is to leap from one side to another with a thousand twists and such agility that they can dodge arrows and spears....

Professional forces trained for war in the army were referred to as quimbares. Before the war against Portugal in the late 16th century, Ndongo could hire Portuguese mercenaries such as the forces of Paulo Dias de Novais in 1575. There also existed special forces referred to as the "Flower of Angola" from 1585 who fell solely under the auspices of the King. Prominent weapons in service of the army included swords and battle axes. Ndongo developed its musketeers starting from the 16th century. In 1585, the army deployed 40 musketeers against Portugal. The Ngola Nzinga fielded 3 Dutch artillery pieces around 1648 in a failed siege of a Portuguese stronghold at Muxima.

Ndongo's army was organized into mass units called mozengos or embalos, divided into sub formations of a center and two wings. The military force could be redivided once more into units called lucanzos that were tasked with special operations. In battle, the gunzes detachment laid out the initial attacks. During campaigns, the Ndongo army could build field fortifications mostly made of wood. According to the research of historian Thornton, in the 1585 campaign against Portugal, the army "constructed four or five forts 'of wood and straw after their fashion' each a day's journey apart to cover their retreat." Ndongo possessed, in addition, a naval force of rivercraft. In 1586, the navy employed 8 "great canoes" across the Lucala River, each possessing some personnel of 80–90 people.

== Culture ==
People in the Kingdom of Ndongo were multilingual, often speaking both Kimbundu and Kikongo. Urban and non-farming people within the kingdom grew a variety of crops, and thus still possessed advanced farming skills.

Locally woven garments were worn by citizens of the kingdom, with men wearing "long garments" that extended from waist-to-foot, with a fringe on the bottom. Women instead wore skirts, which went down to their knees and did not always have a fringe.

A large amount of kin networks in the kingdom were matrilineal, but they could be either virilocal or matrilocal. In matrilineal households, the male relatives of one's mother would take on fatherly roles. Some in the kingdom practiced polygamy.

=== Social structure ===
The Kingdom of Ndongo was composed mostly of free commoners, who were called ana murinda, or "children of the murinda". In addition to the commoners, there were two enslaved groups. The ijiko or kijikos (sing. kijiko) were enslaved commoners who were originally captured during a war and permanently attached to specific territories as serfs, but they could not be sold. The abika or mubikas (sing. mubika) were war captives who were judicially enslaved and could be bought, sold, or inherited.

Due to the close pretexts of kijiko and mubika enslavement, Ndongo had stringent rules on slavery or the export of enslaved people. To ensure that no ana murinda or kijiko was unjustly taken and sold, the kingdom even went so far as to interview every enslaved person who was marked for export. The legitimacy of their enslavement had to be proven before they were sold outside of the Ndongo.

==== Occupations ====
Occupations in the kingdom were sometimes linked to one's social class, which in turn would be linked to one's lineage or kinship group. These occupational groups included farmers, hunters, metalworkers, miners, saltmakers, dyers, clothmakers, potters, royals, and the servants of royals. Enslaved people has their own status outside this system.

Young female saltmakers made salt by boiling seawater. The responsibility of building houses, fencing villages, metalworking, and long-distance trading fell to men. Farming had gendered traits in the kingdom. Men were more likely to engage in slash and burn agriculture to grow trees, while women tended to utilize hoe-farming and crop rotation for other crops. Mothers brought their children to the fields with them while they farmed, to take care of them.

=== Marriage ===
In the society of the Kingdom of Ndongo, women perpetuated their clans, thus motherhood became more central to their identity. Two kinds of marriage ritual have been recorded to exist in the kingdom, one being more formal than the other. Inexpensive gifts were given to the potential bride in less formal scenarios, such as palm wine, palm oil, and local cloth. Both her groom and her brother would give her gifts to lay some claim on the children she bore. Documentation indicates divorce was easier to obtain in these marriages, with some researchers referring to them as "trial marriages".

==== Formal marriages ====
Formal marriage required more expensive gifts and more involved additional rituals. In these marriages, it was harder to acquire a divorce. After reaching puberty, children of formal marriages left the dwellings of the husband's family, moving in with the male kin of their mother.

=== Burial traditions ===
Research indicates that burials dating to the 5th century at Caculo Cabaça represent an earlier form of the burial traditions seen in the Kingdom of Ndongo. Giovanni Cavazzi da Montecuccolo documented the burial traditions within the polity in the 17th century, noting locals did not disturb them due to superstition. Researchers proposed the construction of tumuli was shared between the 5th century burials and the burials of Ndongo, as part of a common burial tradition. They also note commonalities with burial tumuli located in Quibaxe. They conclude the burials at Caculo Cabaça represent the oldest archaeological evidence of ceramic funerary urns in Angola, which they compare to the use of ceramic vessels in rituals during the rule of Nzinga in the 17th century.

== Sources ==
Ndongo's history is primarily known through the writings of Portuguese missionaries, administrators, and travelers. Much of this work was gathered in the monumental collection of sources, in the original languages by António Brásio. In addition, several Italian Capuchin missionaries, especially Giovanni Antonio Cavazzi and António da Gaeta, wrote book-length descriptions of the country in the mid-seventeenth century when it split into Nzingha's half and Hari a Kiluanji's half. However, the Capuchin's work included detailed recountings of oral tradition.

- António Brásio, ed. Monumenta Missionaria Africana, 1st series (15 volumes, Lisbon, 1952–88)
- Antonio de Oliveira de Cadornega, Historia geral das guerras angolanas, 1680-81, ed. Matias Delgado (3 volumes, Lisbon, 1940–42, reprinted 1972)

== Notable people ==
- Nzinga of Ndongo, Queen of Ndongo
- Filipe of Ndongo, Ruler of Ndongo
- First Africans in the American colonies, including:
  - Angela
  - Anthony Johnson
  - Emanuel Driggus
  - John Graweere
  - Margaret Cornish
- Gullah Jack

== See also ==
- Kingdom of Matamba
- List of Ngolas of Ndongo
- Category:Matamban and Ndongo monarchs
- African military systems to 1800
- African military systems after 1800

== Bibliography ==
- Ilídio do Amaral, O Reino do Congo, os Mbundu (ou Ambundos) o Reino dos "Ngola" (ou de Angola) e a presença Portuguesa de finais do século XV a meados do século XVI (Lisbon, 1996)
- David Birmingham, Trade and Conquest in Angola (Oxford, 1966)
- Beatrix Heintze, Studien zur Geschichte Angolas im 16. und 17. Jahrhundert: Ein Lesebuch (Cologne, 1996).
- Joseph C. Miller, Kings and kinsmen: early Mbundu states in Angola, Oxford, England: Clarendon Press, 1976, ISBN 0198227043
- Graziano Saccardo, Congo e Angola con la storia dell'antica missione dei Cappuccini (3 vols, Venice, 1982–83)
- Thornton, John Kelly (2020). A History of West Central Africa to 1850. Cambridge University Press. ISBN 9781107127159. ISSN 2753-0116.
- Thornton, John Kelly (1999). Warfare in Atlantic Africa, 1500-1800. Psychology Press. ISBN 9781857283921.
