= Kongo textiles =

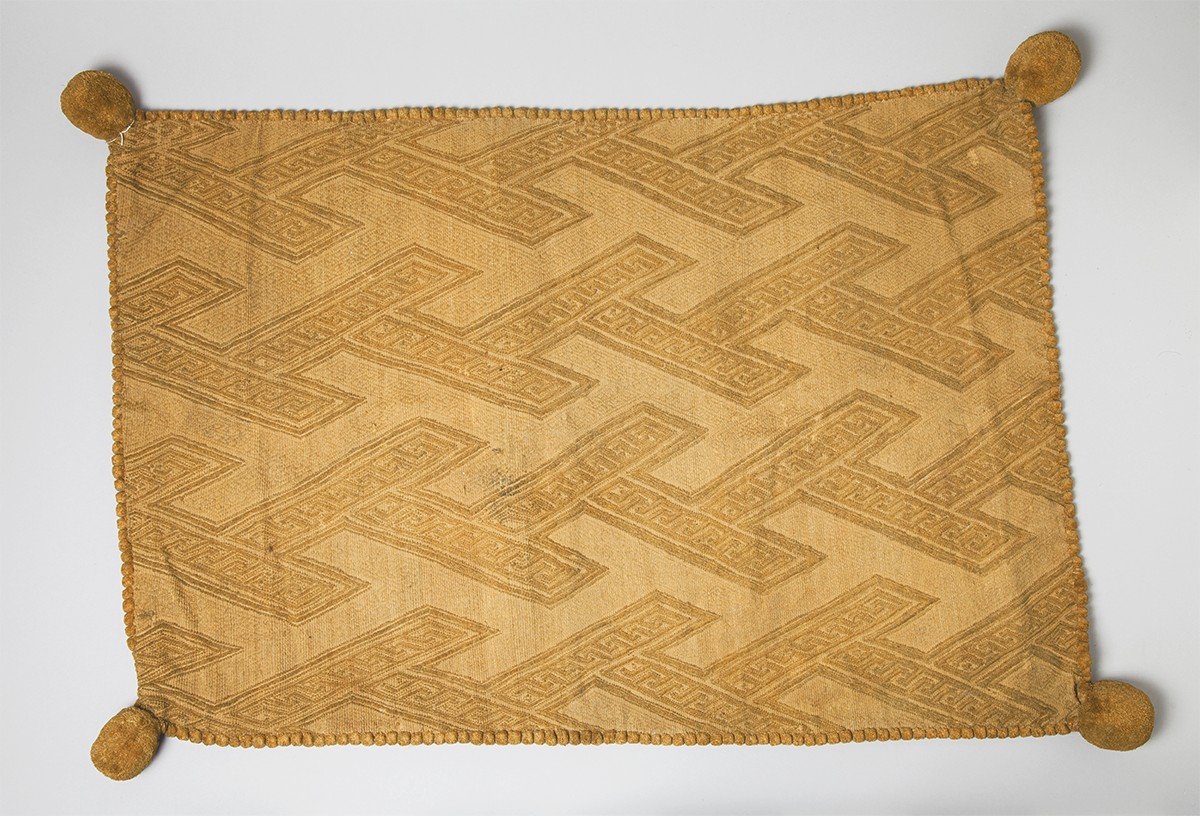
Cushion Cover, from the collection of the Ethnographic Museum, Stockholm

In the Kongo Kingdom and its vassals (Loango, Kakongo, Ngoyo), the woven arts were emblematic of kingship and nobility. The coarse filament stripped from the fronds of the raffia palm tree served as the foundation of the Kongo weaving arts. This material imposed constraints that were overcome to produce varied and ingenious textile formats and structures. Raffia cloth (singular : Lubongo, Libongo, plural : Mbongo; also called Mpusu) was used as currency.

== Chief of nobleman's cap, Mpu or Ngunda ==
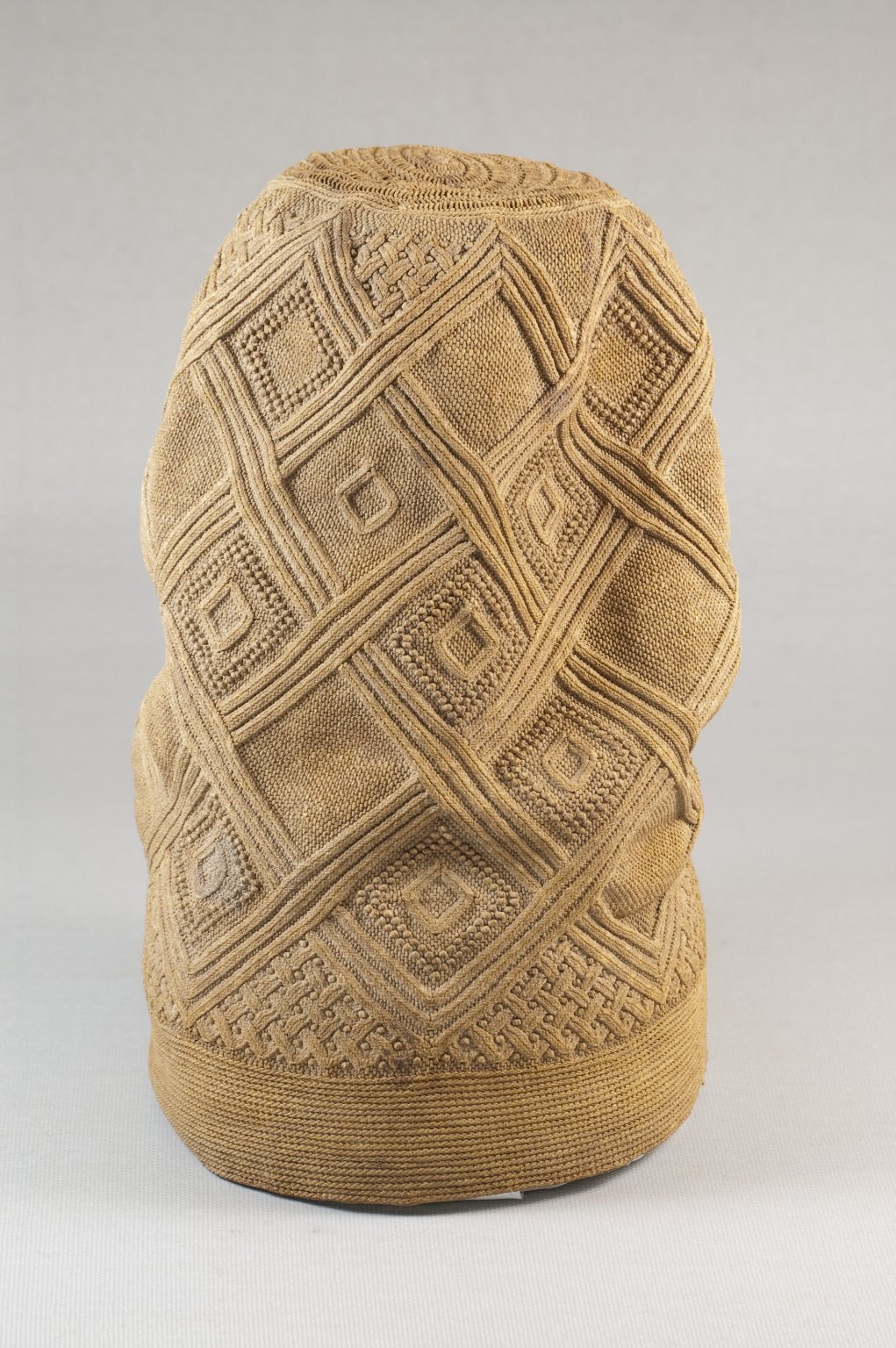
Mpu, from the collection of the Brooklyn Museum

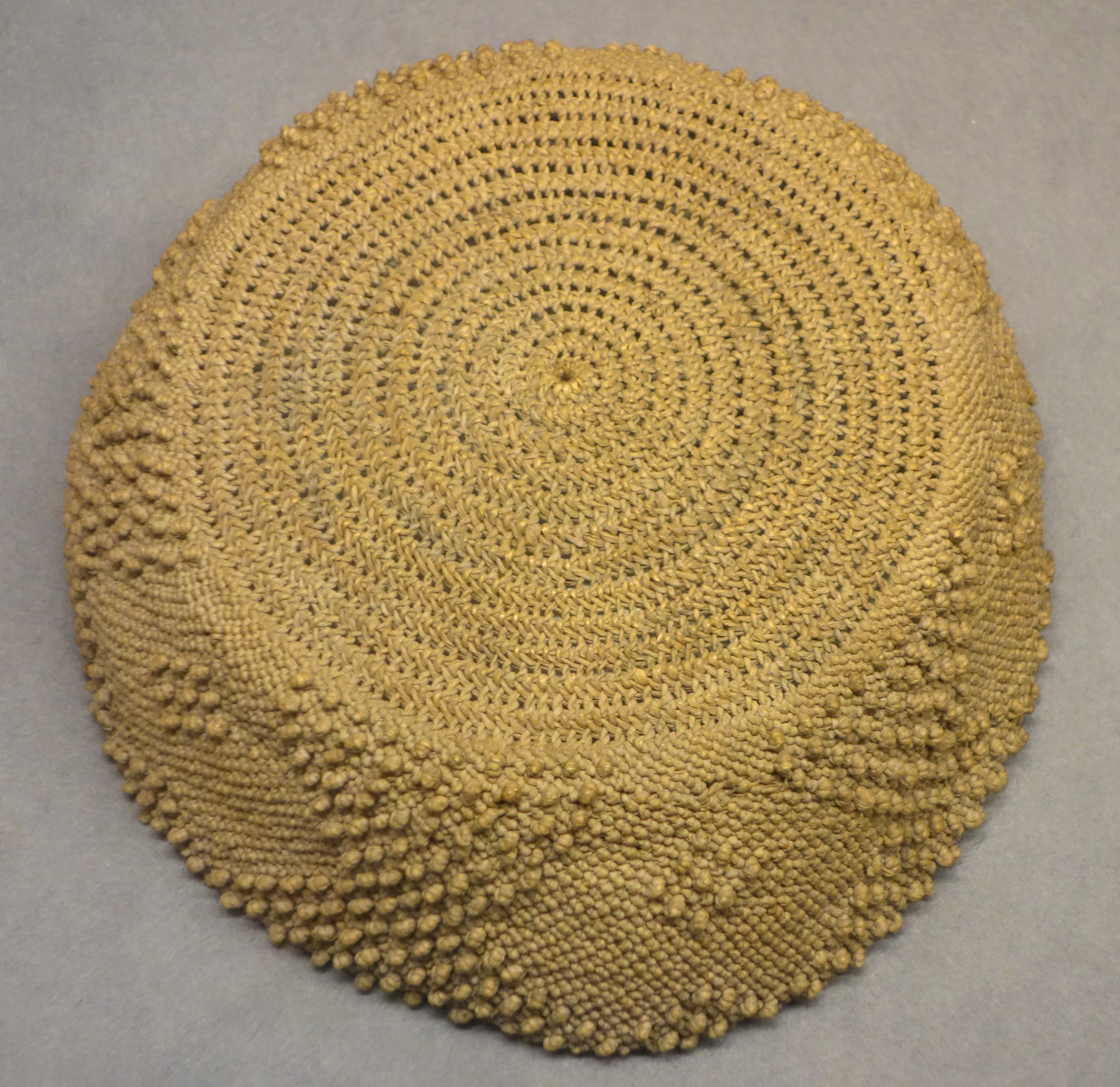
Mpu, from the collection of the Royal Museum for Central Africa

The mpu was a supple knotted cap of golden raffia or pineapple fiber and a vital component of the chief's regalia, which also included a kinzembe mesh tunic, a woven chest bag, a charm bag (nkisi), a reliquary basket, the double bell, and a stool.

For Kongo, Mbundu, and related peoples in northern Angola, the mpu signified the authority invested in a person elected to an office of sacred leadership. Moraga writes that "it was also a potent cosmological symbol connecting the chief (mfumu), the kin group, and the village to a mythic place of origin as well as a specific territorial domain (nsi)."

There are several types of mpu hats. The ngunda (from the root ngu, meaning mother) is an unstructured domed style decorated with high-relief patterns that was bestowed on new chiefs during investiture rites. The ngola is a taller, conical cap worn by the paramount leaders of the Kongo realm.

Nearly all caps are constructed in spiral form, working from the center of the crown to the edge of the hat border. Mpu were designed to cover the spiritually vulnerable top of the head. The Kongo people used the term nzita to express their belief that hair grew in a circular pattern in this spot. According to Moraga, "The crows of caps are typically worked with a spiraling lattice or openwork pattern that differs from the interlacing geometric designs on the sides- as if to mimic the whorls of the hair while accentuating the extraordinary protection afforded by the headwear."

== Chief's Kinzembe ==
The Kinzemba is an openwork tunic made of raffia fiber. The Kinzembe is unique among Central African ceremonial garments for having a traceable chronology that spans several hundred years and for the fact that it can be linked with a specific historical figure. Antonio Manuel was a Kongo ambassador to the Vatican who died in 1608, shortly after arriving in Rome. He is represented wearing a Kinzembe (called nkutu in Kongo) in a memorial bust commissioned by the Pope after Antonio Manuel's death. In 1688 in Angola, Capuchin priest Girolamo Merolla recorded the following description of a Kinzembe: "The gentry have a kind of straw garment on their shoulders, which reaches down to their wastes, curiously wrought, wit their arms coming out at two slits, and ends in two tassels which hang down on the right side. About their wastes they have a cloth girth, which on one side hangs down to the ground."

== Baskets ==
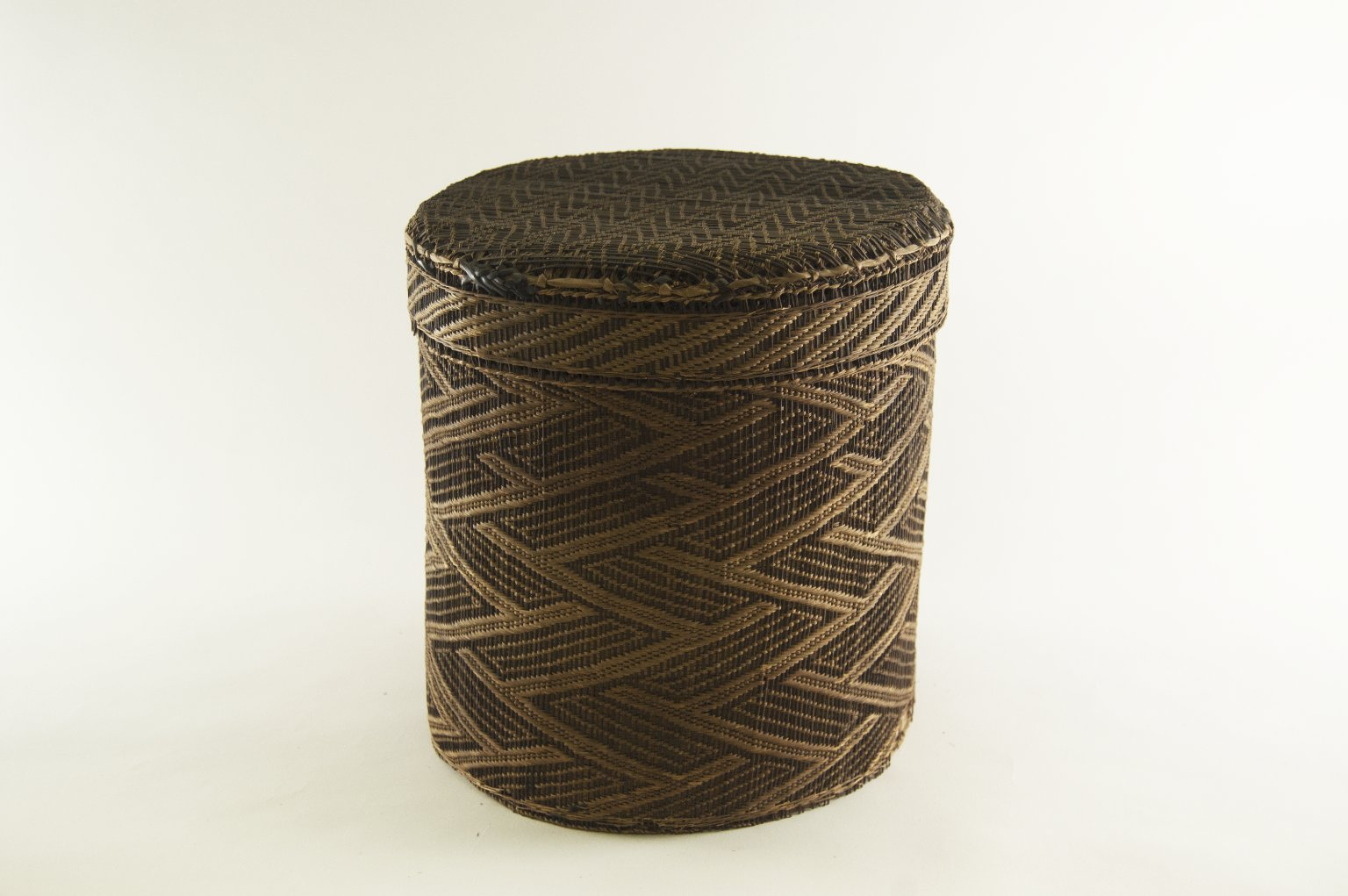
Large round basket with cover, from the collection of the Brooklyn Museum

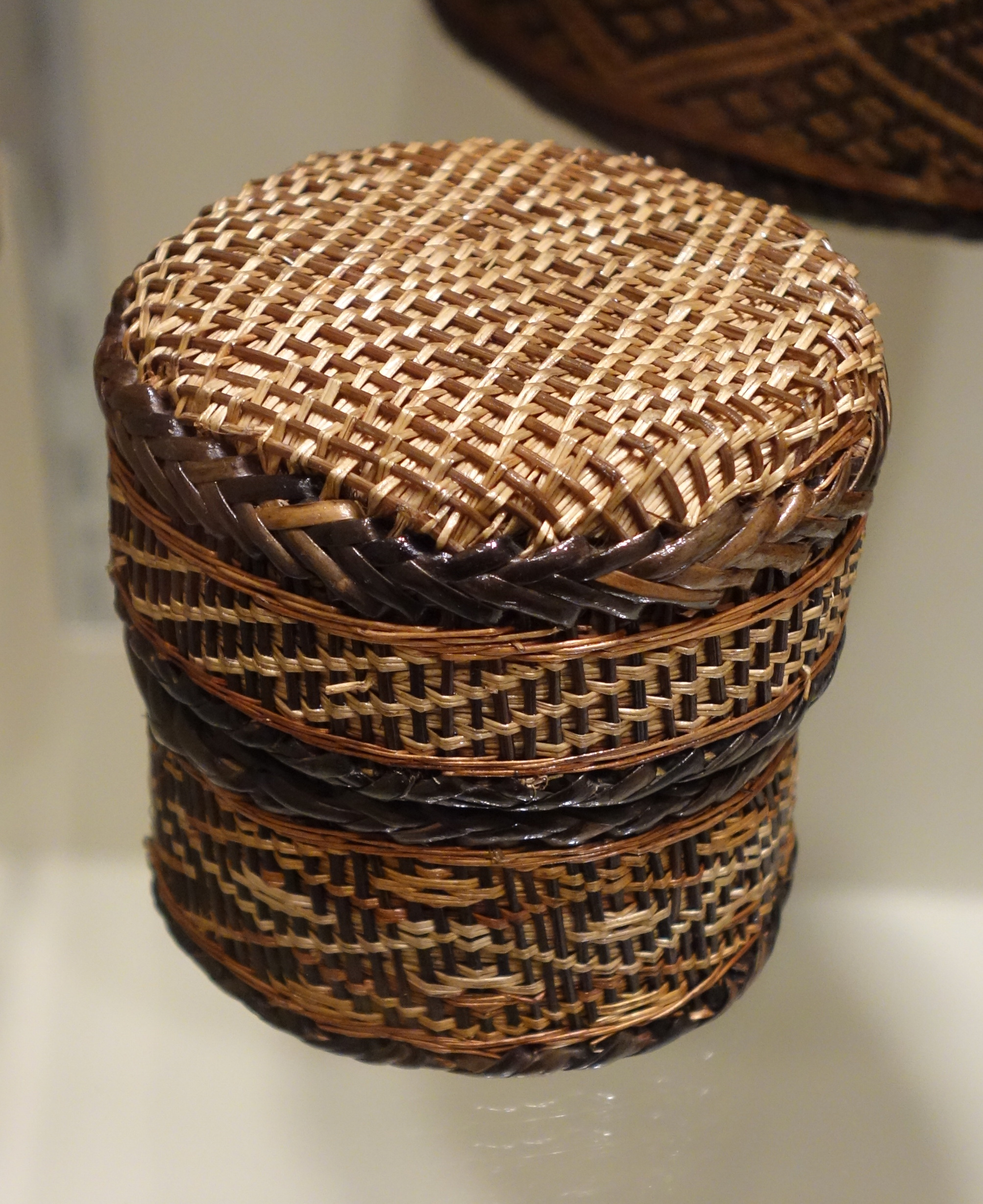
Large round basket with cover, from the collection of the Cincinnati Art Museum.

Kongo baskets were displays of prestige and wealth. They were given as gifts to notables and foreigners as well as used by the wealthy and elite. These baskets often held prestige goods of great status that were given to the king. Special baskets also featured prominently in the ritual practice and belief of Kongo peoples.

Kongo baskets were fabricated with twill-patterned raffia fiber sides over a solid inner structure of wood or bark. The baskets' dynamic configurations of zig zags, diamonds, and chevrons arise naturally from a twill or plaiting technique using dyed or natural raffia fibers. They evolved into culturally significant patterns, which were translated into other media, such as funerary terracottas. Baskets have also been made with reed fibers.

== Parallels with Kuba textiles ==
Although separated by time and geography, there are many parallels between the Kongo and Kuba textile traditions. Both Kongo and Kuba art flourished within a hierarchical, courtly structure, and each society accorded high value to the arts of ceremony, personal adornment, and display. They also had in common the use of raffia palm fiber as the foundation of their weaving arts. Kongo and Kuba also share many geometric motifs, sacred signs, symbolic insignia, and types of textiles and prestige regalia, as well as techniques of fabrication.
