= Anna Tychsen =

Danish ballet dancer

Anna Regina Tychsen (1853–1896) was a German-born Danish ballet dancer. She perfected her technique with the result that she became a soloist as early as 1872. She is remembered in particular for her roles in August Bournonville's ballets, performing the title role in La Sylphide, Eliza and Victorine in Le Conservatoire and Céleste in Torreadoren.

== Biography ==
Born on 1 September 1853 in Bremen, Anna Regina Scholl was the daughter of the sculptor Philip Jean Josef Scholl (1805–1861) and the actress Theodora Jocunda Dalhoff (1826–1892). When she was only five years old, she appeared on stage at the Odense Teater where her mother was employed. In 1861, she entered the Royal Danish Ballet School where she was taught by Georg Nicolai Brodersen (1819–1908). She also received private lessons from Bournonville at her home in Frederiksberg. On 11 October 1876, she married the Danish officer Valentin Emil Tychsen (1847–1914) in Odense.

When she was 14, she was allowed to appear in Pas de Trois Cousines together with Betty Hennings who was to perform with her frequently. Her début was on her 15th birthday when she danced a Spanish seguidilla. She completed her education at the Paris Opera Ballet School.

Tychsen had to fight hard for prominent roles as she did not exhibit the natural charisma of many of her colleagues. During her early training, Bournonville had commented that she would have to dance "twice as well as the others as she was really no beauty". She nevertheless progressed, succeeding in being assigned the role of Edvard, a naval cadet in Fjernt fra Danmark, in 1868. After becoming a soloist in 1872, she went on to perform in various roles in Bournonville's ballets. These included the title role in La Sylphide, Eliza and Victorine in Le Conservatoire and Céleste in Torreadoren. In 1887, she was a guest dancer at the Royal Swedish Opera. To enthusiastic applause, she retired in June 1889, once again as the naval cadet Edvard.

Anna Tychsen died in Copenhagen on 21 November 1896.
