= Princess Anne de Bauffremont-Courtenay =

French noble

Anne de Bauffremont-Courtenay
- Born: 1 April 1919; Paris, France
- Died: 15 February 1945 (aged 25); KZ Ravensbrück, Germany

Princess Anne de Bauffremont-Courtenay (1 April 1919 – 15 February 1945) was a French resistance fighter of the Second World War.

She was born in Paris, France, the daughter of Pierre d'Alcantara de Bauffremont, Prince-Duc de Bauffremont-Courtenay and Therese Chevrier. She was a member of the French Resistance and was arrested by the Gestapo on 6 July 1944 in Paris, then locked up for three weeks in Fresnes Prison, where she was interrogated under torture but did not speak. She was deported by the last train departing from Île-de-France on 15 August 1944 and interned in Ravensbrück where she died of dysentery. There is a plaque in her memory at the Picpus Cemetery in Paris. She was the elder sister of Prince Jacques de Bauffremont.
