= Princess Anne of Denmark =

Princess Anne of Denmark may refer to:

- Anne of Denmark, Electress of Saxony (1532–1585), wife of Augustus of Saxony
- Anne of Denmark (1574–1619), wife of James VI and I
- Anne, Queen of Great Britain (1665–1714), known as Princess Anne of Denmark between her marriage and accession
- Anne Bowes-Lyon (1917–1980), wife of Prince Georg of Denmark
- Queen Anne-Marie of Greece (born 1946), born Princess Anne-Marie of Denmark
