= Princess Anna =

Princess Anna may refer to:

- Anna (Frozen), a character from Disney's Frozen
- Anna, Grand Duchess of Lithuania (died 1418), Grand Duchess of Lithuania (1392–1418)
- Anna of Denmark (1532–1585), Electress of Saxony and Margravine of Meissen
- Anna of Poland, Countess of Celje (1366–1425), countess consort of Celje in Slovenia
- Anna of Russia (1693–1740), Empress of Russia from 1730 to 1740

== See also ==
- Princess Anne (disambiguation)
