= Queen Anne style =

Queen Anne style may refer to:

- Queen Anne style architecture, the 18th century Queen Anne style architecture in Britain
- British Queen Anne Revival architecture of the late 19th century in Britain
- New World Queen Anne Revival architecture, the late 19th and early 20th centuries revival of Queen Anne style architecture, which encompasses
  - Queen Anne style architecture in the United States, the Queen Anne revival style architecture in the United States
  - Australian Queen Anne style, a component of Australian Federation architecture
- Queen Anne style furniture, the Queen Anne style of furniture design
