= Kimbundu =

Bantu language of northwest Angola

- North Mbundu
- Native to: Angola
- Region: Bengo Province, Luanda Province, Icolo e Bengo Province, Cuanza Norte Province, Cuanza Sul Province, Malanje Province
- Ethnicity: Ambundu
- Native speakers: 3.7 million (2024)
- Language family: Niger–Congo?: Atlantic–Congo; Benue–Congo; Bantoid; Southern Bantoid; Bantu (Zone H); Kimbundu languages (H.20); Kimbundu
- Dialects: Kimbundu proper (Ngola); Mbamba (Njinga)

Official status
- Official language in: Angola ("National language")

Language codes
- ISO 639-2: kmb
- ISO 639-3: kmb
- Glottolog: kimb1241
- Guthrie code: H.21

A Kimbundu speaker, recorded in Angola

Kimbundu, a Bantu language also known as Mbundu or North Mbundu (to distinguish it from Umbundu or South Mbundu), is the second-most-spoken Bantu language in Angola. Its speakers include the Ambundu people (Note: Ambundu is the short form for Akwa Mbundu, where 'Akwa' means 'from', or 'of', or more originally 'originally from' and 'belonging to'. In Kimbundu language, the particle Akwa is shortened into simply A, so that instead of Akwa Mbndu, it becomes Ambundu; similarly the term Akwa Ngola becomes ANgola, then Angola. Ngola was the title for kings in the historic Northern Angolan kingdom, before the Portuguese invasion and colonization.), and are mostly concentrated in the north-west of the country, in the Bengo, Luanda, Icolo e Bengo, Cuanza Norte, Cuanza Sul, and Malanje provinces. Around 3.7 million people worldwide speak Kimbundu (as of 2024).

Northern Mbundu
- Person: Mumbundu
- People: Ambundu or Akwambundu
- Language: Kimbundu
- Country: Ndongo and Matamba

== Phonology ==
=== Consonants ===
		Labial	Alveolar	Palatal	Velar	Glottal
Stop	plain	p	t		k	
Stop	voiced	b				
Stop	prenasalized	ᵐb	ⁿd		(ᵑɡ)	
Fricative	voiceless	f	s	ʃ		h
Fricative	voiced	v	z	ʒ		
Fricative	prenasalized	ᶬv	ⁿz	ⁿʒ		
Nasal		m	n	(ɲ)	ŋ	
Approximant		w	l	j		

Allophones:

[ɸ] and [β] are allophones of /p/ and /b/, respectively, before /a/ and /u/. The phoneme /l/ is phonetically a flap [ɾ], a voiced plosive [d] or its palatalized version [dʲ] when before the front high vowel /i/. In the same way, the alveolars /s/, /z/ and /n/ are palatalized to [ʃ], [ʒ] and [ɲ], respectively, before [i]. There may be an epenthesis of [g] after /ŋ/ in word medial positions, thus creating a phonetic cluster [ŋg] in a process of fortition.

There is long distance nasal harmony, in which /l/ is realized as [n] if the past morphemes contain /m/ or /n/, but not a nasal sound stops in pronuciations.

=== Vowels ===
	Front	Back
Close	i	u
Mid	e	o
Open	a	

There are two contrasting tones: a high (á) and a low tone (à). There is also a downstep in cases of tonal sandhi.

=== Vowel harmony ===
There is vowel harmony in two groups (the high vowels /i, u/ and the mid and low vowels /e, o, a/) that applies only for verbal morphology. In some morphemes, vowels can be deleted normally to prevent a hiatus.

== Kimbundu alphabet ==
Consonants

B D F G H J K L M N P S T V W X Y Z

Vowels

A E I O U

== Loans ==
=== Portuguese ===
There is a small number of words of Kimbundu origin, and many of those are indirect and come via Angolan Portuguese.

bué (pronounced [bwɛ], "very, a lot"),

cota ([ˈkɔtɐ], "old person")

mambo ([ˈmɐ̃bu])

Zumbi ("zombie"; is the name of the quilombo leader or chief Zumbi dos Palmares), it comes from Kimbundu nzumbi ("ghost", "spirit") or even nzambi ("god").

Semba, is a traditional Angolan music and type of dance and it is also related to the Brazilian dance style samba ; it comes from Kimbundu semba ("belly-bump").

Cafuné ("caress", it is usually passing one's fingers softly through someone's hair or some specific parts in the body), comes from Kimbundu kifuné.

Bunda ("buttocks") it originates from Kimbundu mbunda.

== Conjugation ==
Personal pronouns	Translation
Eme	I
Eie / Eye	You
Muene	He or she
Etu	We
Enu	You
Ene	They

Conjugating the verb to be (kuala; also kukala in Kimbundu) in the present:

Eme ngala	I am
Eie uala / Eye uala / Eie wala / Eye wala	You are
Muene uala / Muene wala	He or she is
Etu tuala / Etu twala	We are
Enu nuala / Enu nwala	You are
Ene ala	They are

Conjugating the verb to have (kuala ni; also kukala ni in Kimbundu) in the present :

Eme ngala ni	I have
Eie / Eye uala ni	You have
Muene uala ni	He or she has
Etu tuala ni	We have
Enu nuala ni	You have
Ene ala ni	They have
