= Ngola (title) =

Rulers of the African state of Ndongo

The Ngola was the title of the king of the Kingdom of Ndongo which existed from the sixteenth to the seventeenth century in what is now north-west Angola. The full title was "Ngola a Kiluanje", which is often shortened to simply "Ngola", hence the name of the modern country. One queen, Nzinga of Ndongo and Matamba, held the title of Ndongo in the kingdom's history.

== See also ==
- Ndongo
- List of Ngolas of Ndongo
- History of Angola
- Ngola (language)
