= Ambundu =

Ethnic group in north-west Angola

Total population
- 9,300,000 (2024)

Regions with significant populations
- Angola; Portugal

Languages
- Kimbundu, Portuguese

Religion
- Christianity, African traditional religions

Related ethnic groups
- Ovimbundu, other Bantu peoples, Afro-Brazilians

Ethnic map of Angola Ambundu/Kimbundu

The Ambundu, also Mbundu or Kimbundu (Mbundu: Ambundu or Akwambundu, singular: Mumbundu), distinct from the Ovimbundu), are a Bantu people who live on a high plateau in present-day Angola just north of the Kwanza River. The Ambundu speak Kimbundu, and most also speak the official language of the country, Portuguese. They are the second biggest ethnic group in the country and make up 25% of the total population of Angola.

Mbundu
- Person: Mumbundu
- People: Ambundu,Akwambundu
- Language: Kimbundu
- Country: Ndongo,Matamba

The Ambundu nowadays live in the region stretching to the East from Angola's capital city of Luanda (see map). They are predominant in the Bengo and Malanje provinces and in neighbouring parts of the Cuanza Norte and Cuanza Sul provinces. The head of the main Ambundu kingdom was called a Ngola, which is the origin of the name of the country Angola.

== Language ==
The Mbundu speak the Kimbundu language, which has multiple dialects, normally relating to the region from which you are from. Two of the main dialects are: Akwaluanda and Ambakista. Spoken in Luanda in the west, Akwaluanda (also referred to as Ambundu) developed from interactions between Kimbundu speakers and other ethnic groups in the region. Spoken in Ambacca in the east, Ambakista developed from interactions between Kimbundu speakers and Portuguese traders.

Ambundu
- Person: Mumbundu
- People: Ambundu or Akwambundu
- Language: Kimbundu
- Country: Ndongo and Matamba

== Origins ==
The exact origin of the Mbundu people is unknown, but there are some oral traditions that were passed down through the generations. The first oral tradition says that the Mbundu came from "the great water." Many historians interpreted this as the Atlantic Ocean and cite their origin as Luanda Island. This oral tradition also speaks of five great ancestors of the Mbundu: Zundu dya Mbulu, the mother of the Ndongo people; Kajinga ka Mbulu, founder of the Mbondo Kingdom; Matamba a Mulu, mother of the Pende people; and Kongo dya Mbulu, founder of the Hungu people.

The second oral tradition records that a man named Mussuri rose from ironworker to king of the Mbundu. After marrying a woman named Ngola Inene, they are said to have birthed a daughter named Samba. Samba gave birth to 8 children, who later begot the Ndongo, the Mbondo, the Pende, the Hungu, the Lenge, the Imbangala, the Songo and the Libolo people.

The Pende people tell an oral tradition of a single ancestor named Ngola Kilanji, who ruled over hunters and warriors at Tandji in Milumbu near the Zambezi River. Then Ngola moved his people west towards the sea, creating villages, or jingundu, along the way until they reached Luanda on the coast. He later unified his people with another group that was led by a master blacksmith named Bembo Kalamba and his wife Ngombe dia Nganda. Bembo's people introduced Ngola's people to farming, cattle-herding and weaving. This origin story maintains that Ngombe's daughters became the mothers of the Mbundu ethnic groups and that Ngola founded the Kingdom of Ndongo. The royal title ngola is said to be derived from his name. The symbol for iron, which is so called ngola, is still used today by the Mbundu.

== Early history ==
They had been arriving in the Angola region from the early Middle Ages on, but the biggest part of the immigration took place between the 13th and 16th century C.E.. Kimbundu is a West-Bantu language, and it is thought that, in the Bantu migrations, the Ambundu have arrived coming from the North rather than from the East. The Bantu peoples brought agriculture with them. They built permanent villages and traded with the indigenous Pygmies and Khoi-San populations.

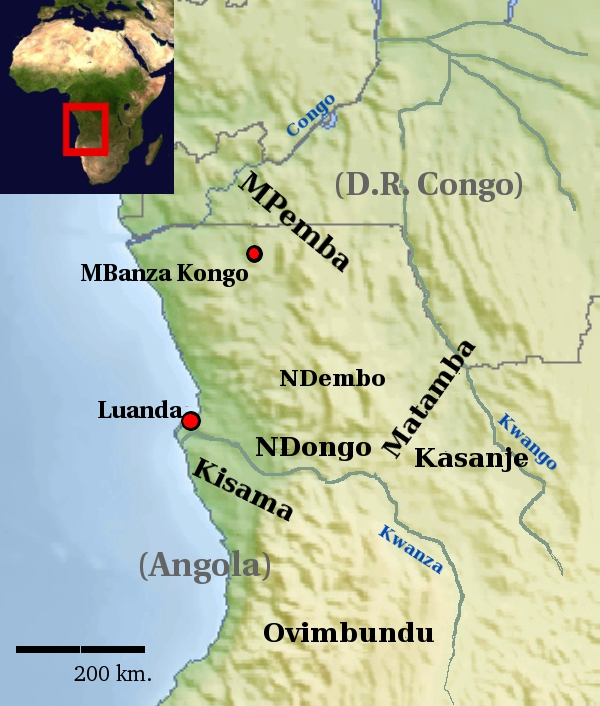
Ambundu-related regions

The Ambundu society consisted of local communities until the 14th century. Their society has always been matrilineal. Land was inherited matrilineally, and the descent system was matrilineal as well. Boys used to go and live in the villages of their maternal uncles, so as to preserve a matrilinear core to the village. Theoretically, the lineage was projected onto status, instead of individuals, which gave the system some flexibility. The latter feature is not found with neighbouring matrilineal peoples, like the Ovimbundu to the South, or the Bakongo to the North.

The name Mbundu was first used by the Bakongo, before it was adopted by the Ambundu themselves.

== Portuguese invasion ==
Kongo, which had been in contact with the Portuguese since 1482, held a monopoly on trade with this country. When Ndongo's king, or ngola, tried to break this monopoly, this led to war, in which the Bakongo were defeated in 1556. Ndongo was now independent, and directly confronted Portugal's colonialism. It allied itself with Matamba against the country in 1590 but was defeated in 1614. Now, Ndongo itself became a target for the slave trade, and its population fled in large numbers to neighbouring states.

Queen Njinga was the daughter of a deceased Ndongo ngola. At the request of Mbandi, the reigning ngola and her brother, she negotiated a peace treaty with the Portuguese. The treaty gave substantial trade and religious advantages to Portugal but delivered Mbandi the throne in Ndongo. After five years, she had to flee from Portuguese troops to Matamba. She became queen of Matamba, a kingdom which was traditionally led by women, and turned it into the most powerful state in the region, and a big exporter of slaves. Matamba, and neighboring Kasanje, had monopolies in the slave trade, and started falling apart in the 19th century when this trade lost in importance. The rise of a new trade in ivory, rubber and wax, which avoided the old monopolies, reduced the power of central authority in the Ambundu states in this century.

The Portuguese defeated Matamba in 1836, and advanced to Kasanje by the middle of the century. Their actual influence, however, was quite limited due to the lack of people, money, and an efficient military. The Ambundu had opportunities to revolt or negotiate liberties. This changed at the end of the 19th century. European countries forced, out of economic, strategic, and nationalistic considerations, a tighter control over African territories. To protect their interests, the Portuguese sent a number of military expeditions into the areas, which they considered to be their colonies, and brought them under actual control. The last Ambundu tribe to be defeated were the NDembo. It took the Portuguese three years to subdue a NDembo revolt in 1910. In 1917 all of their territory was occupied, and they became part of the Portuguese colony of Angola.

== Atlantic Slave Trade ==
Due to conflicts with the Kingdom of Kongo and Portuguese Angola, the Mbundu became substantial victims of the Atlantic Slave Trade in 16th and 17th centuries. The first African slaves brought to colonial America were Mbundu people, who arrived in Virginia in 1619. This caused Mbundu leaders, like Queen Njinga, to retaliate by acquiring weapons from the Dutch in exchange for African prisoners. This led to a treaty in which the Mbundu kingdom of Ndongo supplied 16 thousand slaves per year to the Dutch. Mbundu slaves had a known presence in Latin America (namely Brazil and the Dominican Republic), as well as other regions like Jamaica. The Mbundu were so prevalent in Brazil that a martial art named Capoeira developed from the Ndongo fighting style, which was useful in slave revolts. Candomblé Bantu is an Afro-diaspora religion derived from West-Central Africa that has its origins in Mbundu religion.

== Notable people of Mbundu descent ==
The American actor Chris Tucker discovered on the PBS television programme African American Lives that his matrilineal DNA traced to Mbundu people in present-day Angola. Isaiah Washington, another American actor, has a genealogical DNA link to the Ambundu group through his paternal line.

== See also ==
- Libolo Kingdom
