= Massangano =

- Commune
- Location in Angola
- Country: Angola
- Province: Cuanza Norte
- Time zone: UTC+1 (WAT)
- Climate: Aw

Massangano is a town and commune of Angola, located in the province of Cuanza Norte.

Its name is sometimes written Masango. It was esblished by the Portuguese in 1582 as Fort Nossa Senhora da Vitória to be their base of operations in the interior of modern Angola until the late 17th-century.

== See also ==
- Communes of Angola
