= Cuanza Norte Province =

Province of Angola

Coordinates: 9°1′S 15°4′E

Cuanza Norte
- Province
- Cuanza Norte, province of Angola
- Country: Angola
- Capital: N'dalatando

Government
  - Governor: Joao Diogo Gaspar
  - Vice-Governor for the Political, Economical and Social Sector: Constantina Pereira Furtado Machado
  - Vice-Governor for Technical Services and Infrastructures: Michel Raimundo Luzolo

Area
  - Total: 20,426 km^{2} (7,887 sq mi)

Population (2024 census)
  - Total: 659,097
  - Density: 32.268/km^{2} (83.573/sq mi)
- ISO 3166 code: AO-CNO
- HDI (2018): 0.533 low · 9th of 18
- Website: www.kwanzanorte.gov.ao

Cuanza Norte Province (English: North Cuanza; Umbundu: Konano Kwanza Volupale) is a province of Angola. N'dalatando is the capital and the province has an area of 24,110 km^{2} and a population of 659,097 (2024 census). Manuel Pedro Pacavira was born here and is a former provincial governor. The 1,400 meter long Capanda Dam is located in this province. Cuanza Norte lies on the northern bank of the Cuanza River. It had been a territory of Ngola Kingdom. In 1914, Norton de Matos created District of Cuanza which was divided into Cuanza Norte and Cuanza Sul Provinces in 1917.

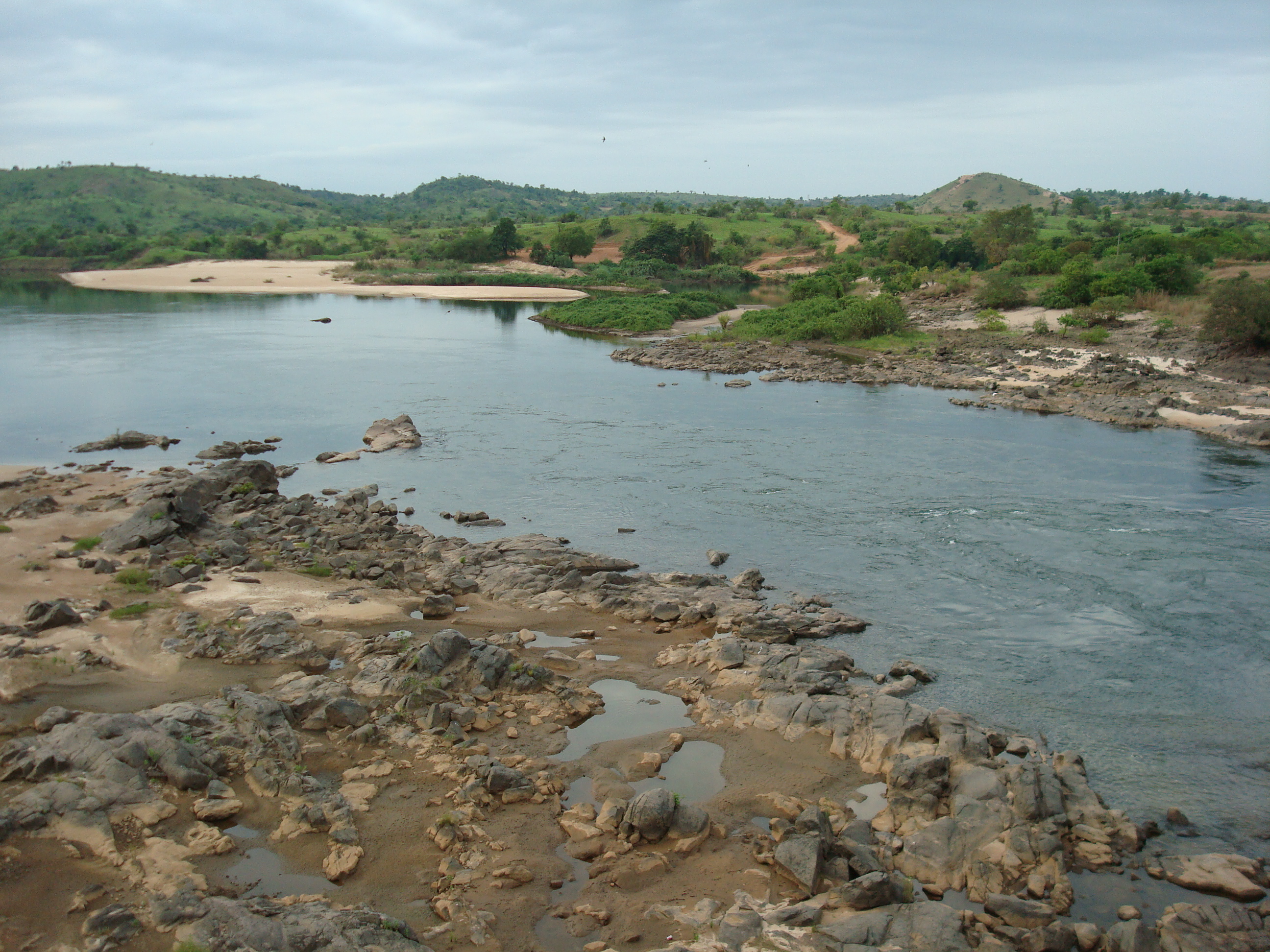
Cambambe, Cuanza Norte Province

It was badly affected during the Angolan Civil War. It has many mines left over from the Civil War and contracts to clear them were given to several organisations. During the civil war, the insurgents made the province part of the central zone. On 5 April 2001, National Union for the Total Independence of Angola members attacked Samba Caju and killed 120 FAA members. The province's military commander, General Recordacao was also killed in the attack.

The most spoken languages are Kimbundu. Mbundu people inhabit the province. Sugarcane and coffee are the most important agricultural crops. Their production is favoured by the tropical humid climate of the province.

== Municipalities ==
The province of Cuanza Norte contains ten municipalities (Portuguese: municípios):

Município	Capital	Area (km2)	Pop. (2006 est)
Ambaca	Camabatela	3,080	123,244
Banga	Banga	1,260	23,284
Bolongongo	Bolongongo	1,061	31,288
Cambambe	Dondo	5,212	91,984
Cazengo	N'Dalatando	1,793	109,256
Golungo Alto	Golungo Alto	1,989	69,918
Ngonguembo	Ngonguembo	1,400	37,405
Lucala	Lucala	1,718	41,792
Quiculungo	Quiculungo	475	30,152
Samba Cajú	Samba Cajú	2,012	95,638

Some sources show the following three municipalities in Bengo Province:

Município	Capital	Area (km2)	Pop. (2006 est)
Bula-Atumba	Bula	3,604	56,718
Dembos,	Quibaxe	2,444	58,941
Pango-Aluquém	Pango	2,754	45,680

While others list those three in Cuanza Norte (Kwanza Norte) Province.

== Communes ==
The province of Cuanza Norte contains the following communes (Portuguese: comunas); sorted by their respective municipalities:

- Ambaca Municipality: – Bindo, Camabatela, Luinga, Maúa, Tango
- Banga Municipality: – Aldeia Nova, Banga, Caculo Cabaça, Cariamba
- Bolongongo Municipality: – Bolongongo, Quiquiemba, Terreiro
- Cambambe Municipality: – Danje-ia-Menha, Dondo, Massangano, São Pedro da Kilemba, Zenza do Itombe
- Cazengo Municipality: – Canhoca, N'dalatando
- Golungo Alto Municipality: – Cambondo, Cêrca, Golungo Alto, Kiluanje
- N'Gonguembo Municipality: – Camame, Cavunga, Quilombo dos Dembos (Ngonguembo)
- Licucala Municipality: – Lukala, Quiangombe
- Quiculungo Municipality: – Quiculungo
- Samba Cajú Municipality: – Samba Cajú, Samba Lucala
- Bula-Atumba Municipality: – Bula-Atumba, Quiage (Kiaje)
- Dembos Municipality: – Paredes, Piri, Quibaxe, São José das Matas
- Pango-Aluquém Municipality: – Cazuangongo (Kazua), Pango-Aluquém

== List of governors of Cuanza Norte ==
Name	Years in office
José Congo Sebastião	1976–1977
Lourenço José Fereira Diandengue	1977–1979
Evaristo Domingos Kimba	1979–1980
Noé da Silva Saúde	1980–1986
Paulo Teixeira Jorge	1986–1989
Francisco Vieira Dias	1989–1991
Manuel Pedro Pacavira	1991–2004
Henrique André Júnior	2004–2016
José Maria Ferraz dos Santos	2016–2019
Adriano Mendes de Carvalho	2019–

Up to 1991, the official name was Provincial Commissioner

== See also ==
- Church of Nossa Senhora da Victoria
