= Luanda Bungo =

Intercity bus and train station

Luanda Bungo Railway Station
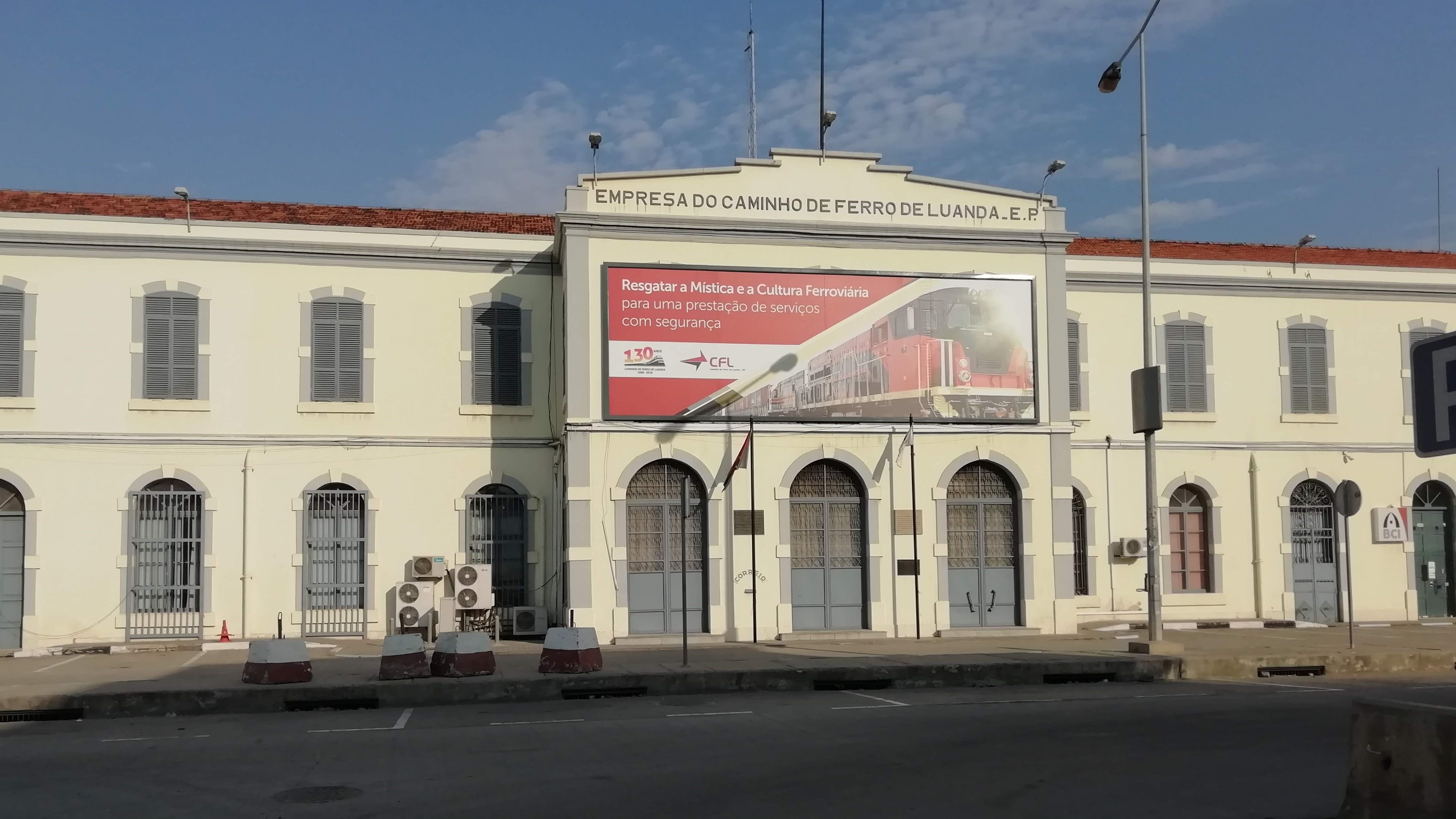
- A view of the frontage of the station

General information
- Location: Rua Major Kanhangulo, No. 1 Angola
- Coordinates: 8°48′19.8″S 13°14′39.93″E
- Owner: INCFA
- Operator: Luanda Railway
- Platforms: 3

History
- Opened: October 31, 1889
- Rebuilt: 2010
Location

Luanda Bungo Railway Station is the main railway station in the Angolan capital of Luanda. The station is located in the Ingombota District of Luanda. It was inaugurated in 1889, along with the first 45-kilometer section of the Ambaca Railway. The station building was classified as Historical and Cultural Heritage site of Angola in 2001. The name comes from the word "Mbungo", which in Kimbundu means "horn", which is a descriptor of the topography of the city from 1846 with trains making a roundabout motion from the interior to the coastline around a large hill on the northern edge of the city center.

== Architecture ==
The station building consists of two floors with a rectangular floorplate. There is a trainyard to the east of the structure which contained three platforms for passengers. The building is of Portuguese colonial design with a simple, non-ornamented facade painted light yellow and with gray windows. The cornice of the station contains the inscription Empresa do Caminho de Ferro de Luanda. According to the original project, the main facade should have included a clock and the acronym CFAA - "Companhia Real dos Caminhos de Ferro through d'Africa".

The station is in a state of good condition and has undergone few major design changes since its inauguration. The second floor of the structure is currently used as an administrative space, while the old warehouse and first floor has been refurbished to house the ticket offices and the passenger waiting room. Passengers enter and exit the station on Rua Major Kanhangulo. The road is a short walk to Luanda Bay, Port of Luanda and the Central Business District.

== Modernization ==
This station is one of the six stations of the Luanda Railway that are being remodeled as part of a project to modernize and improve service between Ingombota and the new Angola International Airport in Zango, Viana. As part of this project, new multimodal building is being built to the east of the existing station. There were two projects prior to the current refurbishment. One in 2010, which provided for the construction of an office building and a station adjacent to the historic building, and another from 2014. Construction on the new terminal began in 2014 but has been stalled. As part of this project, plans to refurbish an old coach house behind the station were shelved and the building was demolished in 2016 in preparation for a newer, larger and more modern rail terminus.

== Services ==
The station is the starting point of the Luanda Railway, which has three lines. The three lines travel between Luanda Bungo, Luanda Musseques, Malanje, Dondo, Angola and Catete, Ícolo e Bengo. Luanda Bungo is the terminal station and one of the fifteen stations of Luanda's suburban train service. Trains both national and regional terminate at Luanda Bungo.

Service	Terminals	Lengtht	Stations	Duration
Luanda Suburban	Luanda Bungo ↔ Catete	64 km	14	2:01
Medium Haul	Luanda Musseques ↔ Dondo	181 km	14	3:28
Long Haul	Luanda Musseques ↔ Malanje	414 km	24	11:44

== See also ==
- Benguela railway
- History of rail transport in Angola
- Moçâmedes Railway
- Railway stations in Angola
- Rail transport in Angola
