= Canhoca, Angola =

Coordinates: 09°15′00″S 14°41′00″E

Canhoca
- Commune
- Location in Angola
- Country: Angola
- Province: Cuanza Norte

Population
  - Estimate (2021): 3,500
- Time zone: UTC+1 (WAT)
- Climate: Aw

Canhoca is a commune and municipal headquarters of Cazengo in northwestern Angola. It is located approximately 35 kilometres (22 mi) south of N'dalatando, the capital of Cuanza Norte Province. As of 2021, it had an estimated population of 3,500 and an area of 1,525 square kilometres (589 sq mi). Agricultural crops cultivated in the region include citrus fruits, cassava, maize, peanuts, and bananas.

== Transport ==
Canhoca is served by a junction station on the Luanda Railway connecting Luanda and Malanje, with a short branch to the north.

=== Historical film ===
The 2004 film Cambaio da Canhoca (The Train of Canhoca) produced by Orlando Fortunato de Oliveira is the dramatization of a real-life atrocity in 1957, when at least 50 Angolans were arrested by Portuguese colonial authorities in Malanje Province. En route from Malanje to Luanda, the political prisoners were abandoned and left to die of asphyxiation in a closed train wagon at Canhoca railway station.

== Development ==
The commune of Canhoca has had electricity via the public network since 2021. Shortly after being crowned Miss Angola 2026, Wandeleia Rodrigues Bango announced a social project to create an intelligent domestic tourism system in Canhoca.

== See also ==
- Railway stations in Angola
