= Operation Viriato =

- Part of Portuguese Colonial War and Angolan War of Independence
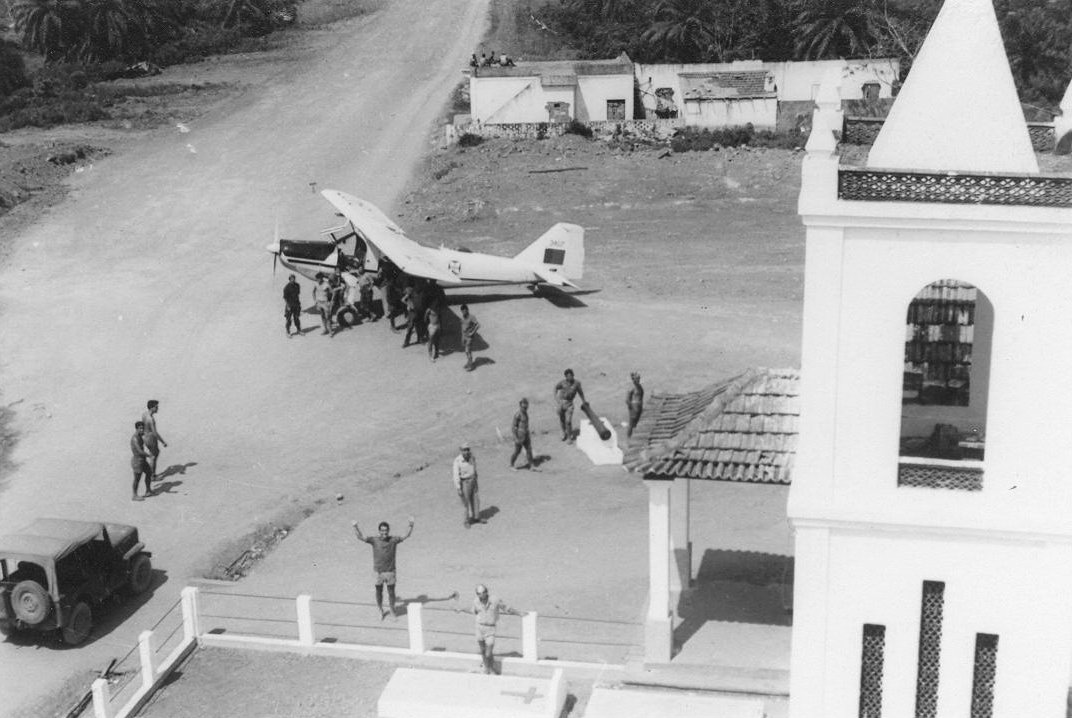
- Portuguese Air Force Dornier Do 27 in Nambuangongo in 1962.
Date	18 July – August 10, 1961
Location	Dembos, Portuguese Angola
Result	Portuguese victory

Belligerents
Portugal	UPA

Commanders and leaders
(Portugal) Armando Maçanita (Portugal) Oliveira Rodrigues (Portugal) Rui Abrantes	Unknown

Units involved
(Portugal) 114th Caçadores Battalion; (Portugal) 96th Caçadores Battalion; (Portugal) 149th Cavalry Squadron	Unknown

Strength
1,300 men	Unknown

Casualties and losses
5 dead, 13 wounded.	150 dead.

Operation Viriato was a military operation carried out by the Portuguese Armed Forces during the Portuguese Colonial War. Its objective was the reoccupation of the Dembos region, particularly Nambuangongo, which had been seized by the UPA and made into their headquarters for subversive action in Angola after the events on March 15 and 16.

At the start of the Portuguese Colonial War in Angola, the UPA enacted a mass uprising with the widespread perpetration of massacres and atrocities against the civilian population, both European and African. Some territory in the Dembos region in northwestern Angola was occupied by the UPA and Nambuangongo selected as their headquarters. Roads were blocked, communications were cut-off and ambushes were common, therefore relief columns setting off from Luanda roughly a week later found it impossible to reach the beleaguered areas. The densely forested terrain favored the UPA. Portuguese troops were forced to march on foot in small units and most many of them could do was round up survivors and bring them to a safe area. Hundreds of coffee producing estates were abandoned or left for dead and the harvest was a risk. Nevertheless, many Portuguese remained and clung on in defiance of the UPA.

In order to recover Nambuangongo, Portuguese command decided to approach Nambuangongo from three angles, in order to divide UPA forces. mobilized Lieutenant-Colonel Armando Maçanita 96th Caçadores Battalion, Colonel Oliveira Rodrigues 114th Caçadores Battalion, and the 149th Cavalry Squadron, under the command of Captain Rui Abrantes. They were supported by artillery and engineering personnel and in total numbered about 1300 men. They were also to open up new roads that would ensure the safety of the local population.

The 96th Caçadores Battalion departed from Quibaxe reinforced by an artillery battery, engineering troops and air support. It passed through Mucondo, Quicundo, Maxalundo. It entered Nambuangongo on the 9th of August, after several engagements with UPA guerrillas in which the Portuguese suffered some casualties. The Portuguese flag was then hoisted over the tower of the local church.

The 114th departed from Luanda, passed through Caxito, Anapasso, and Quanta e Quitabo but was unable to pass beyond Quissacala due to heavy resistance by about 500 UPA guerrillas, which managed to surround the force. The forward vehicles were hit and the Portuguese suffered 5 dead and 13 wounded, while inflicting about 150 dead on UPA forces.

The 149th Cavalry Squadron left Ambriz on the 25th of July, supported by engineering and artillery platoons, totalling 250 men. It passed through Quimbumbe and Zala and removed roadblocks along the way, engaged with UPA guerrillas along the way, and reached Nambuangongo on the morning of August 10.

The Portuguese Air Force provided air recon and bombed not just UPA positions with napalm but also villages suspected of aiding the insurgents.

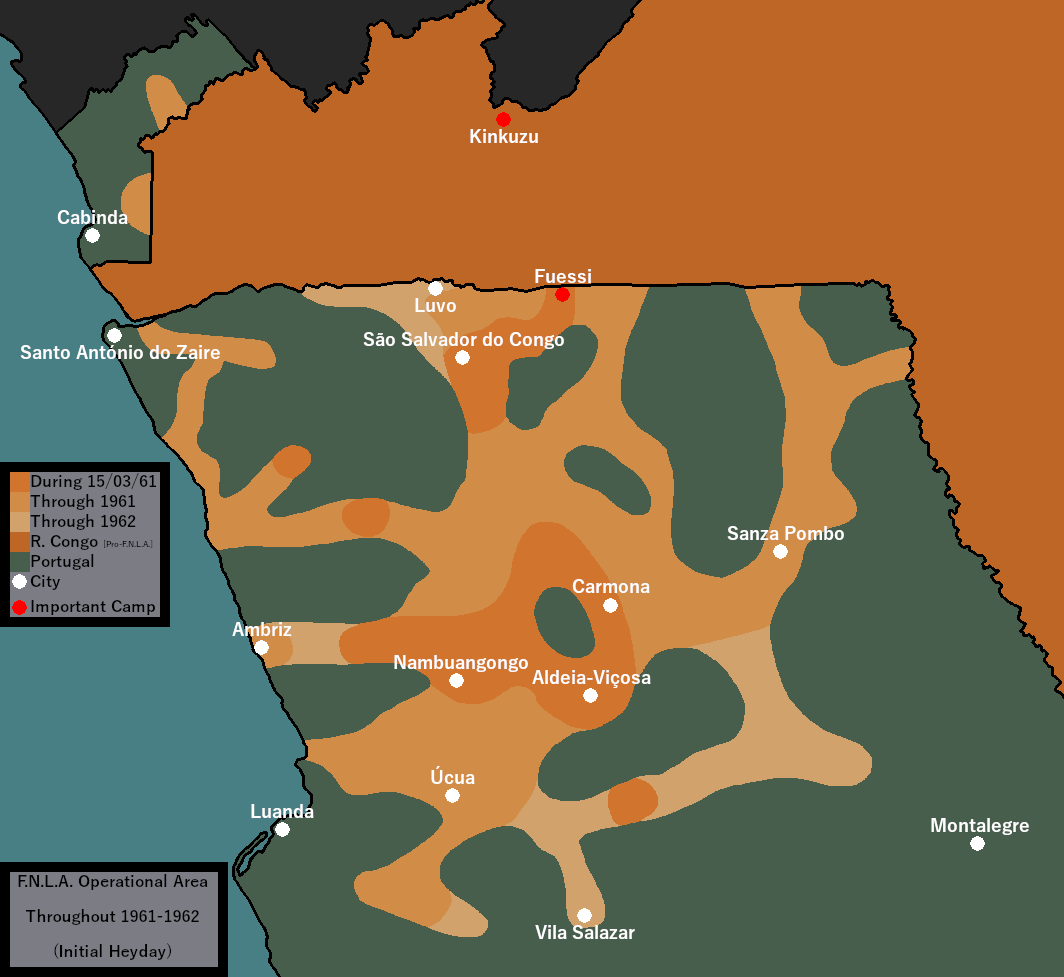
Areas in northwestern Angola afflicted by UPA operations in 1961–1962.

After losing Nambuangongo, UPA forces relocated to the rugged and heavily forested Pedra Verde mountainrange, which the Portuguese Armed Forces would target next. Operation Viriato was followed by Operation Esmeralda

== See also ==
- Operation Esmeralda
- Portuguese Angola
