= Rail transport in Angola =

Angola railway network 1067mm gauge tracks, 610mm gauge tracks

Rail transport in Angola consists of three separate Cape gauge lines that do not connect: the northern Luanda Railway, the central Benguela Railway, and the southern Moçâmedes Railway. The lines each connect the Atlantic coast to the interior of the country. A fourth system once linked Gunza and Gabala but is no longer operational.

== History ==
Railway construction began in Angola in 1887, while the country was a colony of Portugal. The Luanda Railway opened in 1889, the Moçâmedes Railway opened in 1910, and the Benguela Railway opened in 1912. The railways continued to be extended inland until 1961, when the Moçâmedes Railway reached Menongue. After Angola attained its independence from Portugal in 1975, the Angolan Civil War broke out and lasted until 2002. The prolonged fighting resulted in the destruction of most of Angola's railway infrastructure. The rebels blew up bridges, tore up tracks, and sabotaged the right of way with land mines to prevent the railway from being restored.

When the fighting ended, the Angolan government sought to restore service on the railways. Contracts were awarded to the state-owned China Railway Construction Corporation Limited to rebuild the Luanda Railway and the Benguela Railway. A privately owned Chinese mining company rebuilt the Moçâmedes Railway. All three colonial-era Cape gauge lines had been rebuilt by 2015.

== Statistics ==
- total: 2,761 km
- narrow gauge: mainly 2,638 km of 1,067 mm (3 ft 6 in) (Cape gauge)
- there is also 123 km of 600 mm (1 ft 11 5/8 in) gauge (2002)

== Links with neighbouring countries ==
The Benguela Railway connects to the Katanga Railway at the border with the Democratic Republic of the Congo. The first train reached the border town of Luau in August 2013. However, the Congolese railways are in a deteriorated state and no through services are available as of 2015. Passengers and freight must use buses and trucks to reach destinations in Congo.

== Specifications ==
- Brakes: Air
- Couplers: AAR

== Rolling stock ==
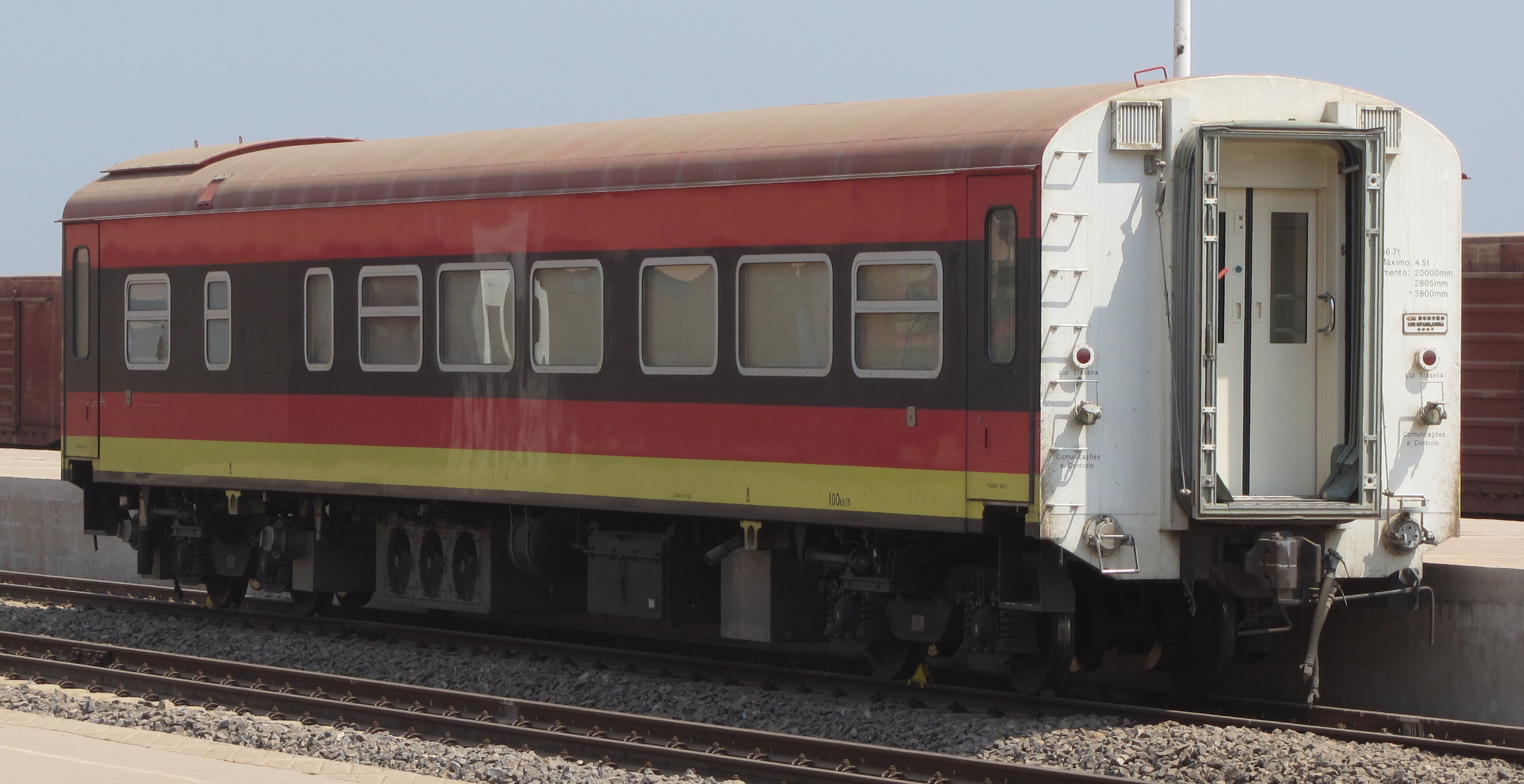
Passenger car at Malanje railway station

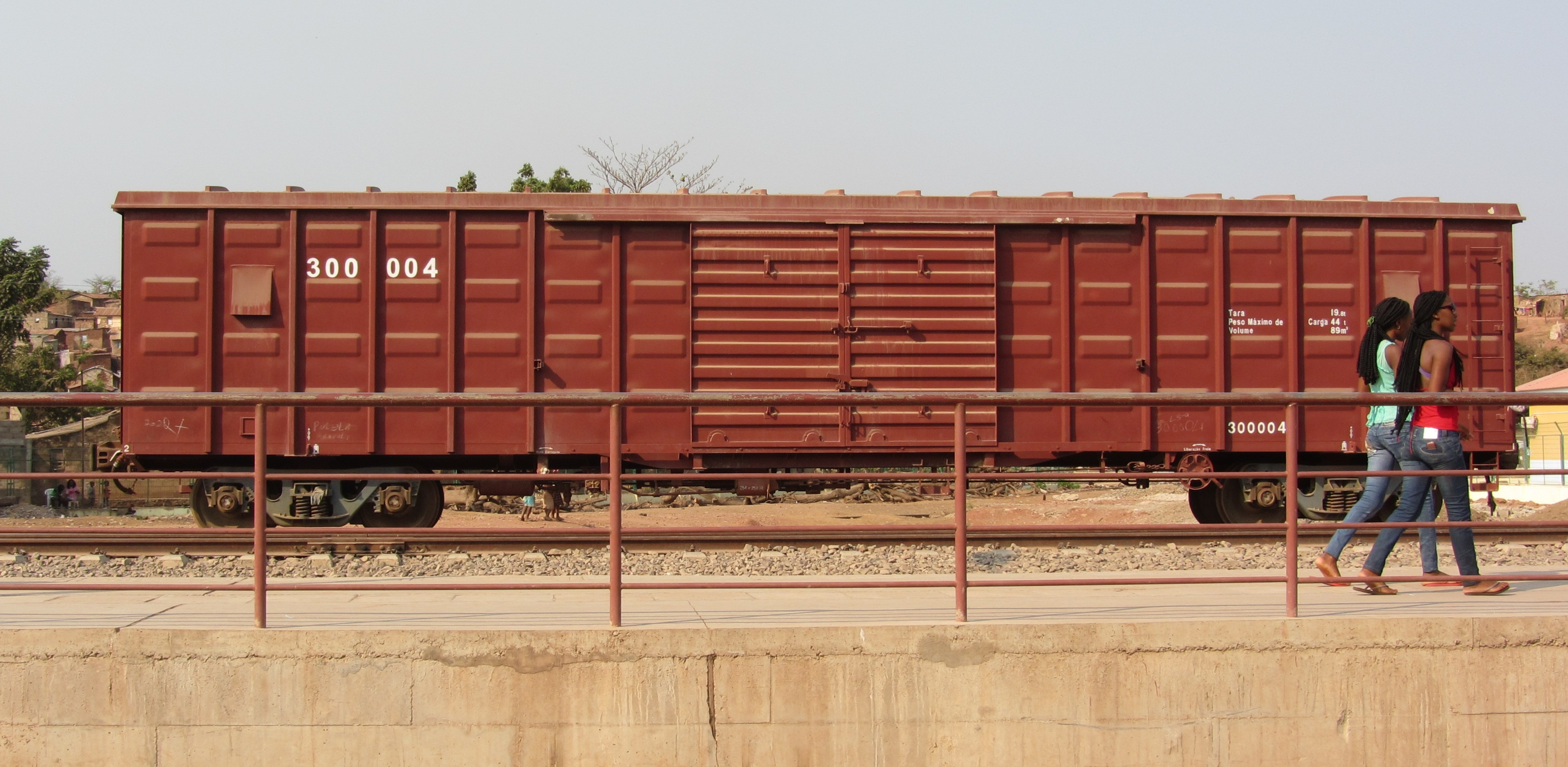
Box car at Donde railway station

Type	Manufacturer	Notes	Source
CKD8F locomotive	CNR Dalian, Dalian, China	None in service	
SDD6A locomotive	CSR		
C30ACi locomotive	GE Transportation	100 total; 45 to Benguela (CFB)	
CRRC DMU	CRRC Tangshan	10 DMUs delivered	
CSR passenger coach	CSR		
CSR box wagon	CSR		
CSR open wagon	CSR		
CSR tank wagon	CSR		

== Railways rehabilitation and modernization programme ==
After the end of the civil war, the government could start to plan both the rehabilitation of the "network" inherited from the colonial power and largely destroyed by the civil war, and its extension by building new lines, interconnecting the existing lines and connecting with all neighbouring countries. If and when completed, this would result in a grid of three east–west lines and three north–south lines, linking all 18 provinces to the railway network. This plan is known also by the name Ango-Ferro.

=== New institutional framework ===
Related to the program to rehabilitate the network inherited from colonial times and the project to build new lines, the institutional framework of railway operations was changed in a series of presidential decrees in 2010.

As the public administrator to oversee, regulate, certify and licence railway companies, infrastructure and rolling stock, the Instituto Nacional dos Caminhos de Ferro de Angola (INCFA – National Institute for Railways in Angola) was created out of the Directorate of Terrestrial Transport within the transport ministry.

All railway infrastructure, lines, tracks, stations, and maintenance facilities were declared to be in the public domain and controlled by the state. The three railway companies became Empresa publica (E.P.), government-operated enterprises reporting to the transport ministry. The infrastructure was separated from the operation of the trains, opening up the possibility that private companies could run trains in the future.

=== Technical integration with SADC countries ===
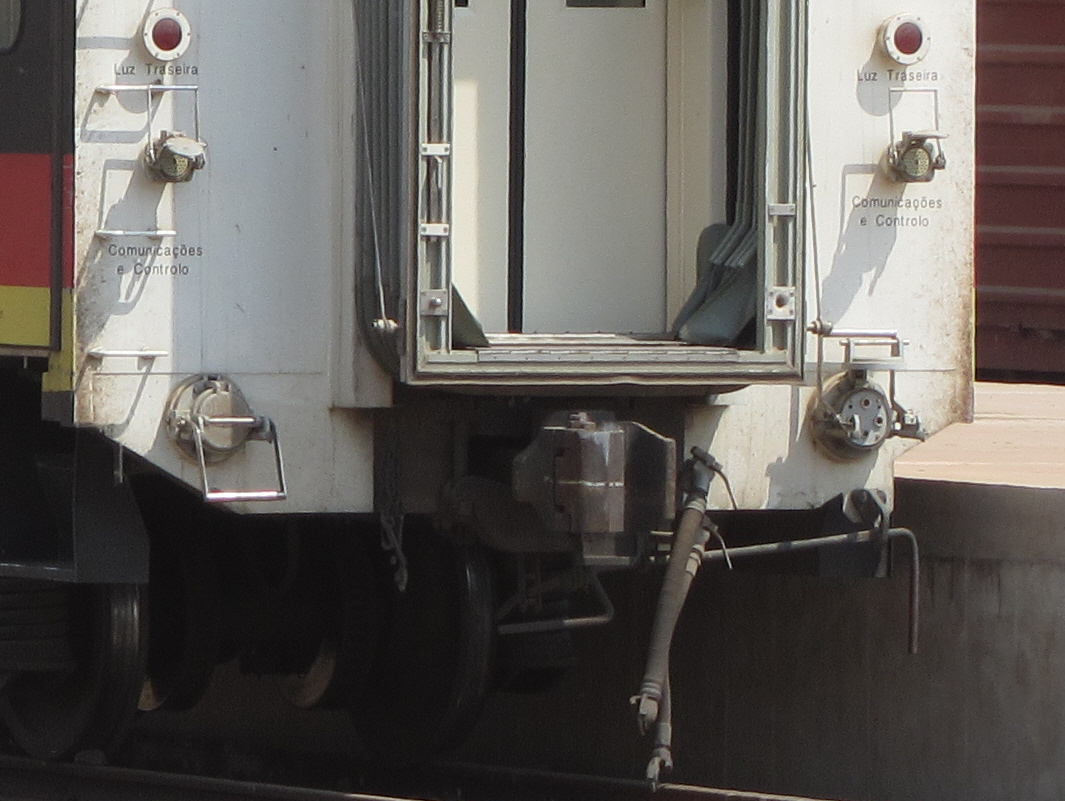
AAR Coupler on new railway cars Twin air brake pipes with taps.

Most railways in the SADC (Southern African Development Community) countries run on Cape gauge 1,067 mm (3 ft 6 in), which facilitates the planned integration of the Angolan railway network with neighbouring countries without requiring trans-shipment at border crossings. To maximize the technical interoperability of rolling stock, the AAR coupler was adopted, which is used in South Africa.

The Southern African Railways Association (SARA) is the body for this standardisation. The three Angolan railway companies are members of SARA.

== Lobito Corridor ==
In 2023, a joint venture called the Lobito Atlantic Railway was formed to explore the Benguela railway corridor, upgrading infrastructure and services.

== Planned new lines ==
As at 2012, the plan involves eight new lines:

=== Caminho de Ferro do Congo ===
This line would start at downtown Luanda and reach the Congo River mouth at Soyo and then Cabinda via a wide eastwards curve passing through Caxito, Ucua, Quibaxe, Dande, Uíge, Songo, Lucunga, Madimba, Zaire, M'banza-Kongo, Quiende, Lufico to Soyo. The line would then cross the Congo River between Soyo and Munanda, continue for about 40 km through the Democratic Republic of the Congo (DRC) before re-entering Angolan territory in the Cabinda province at Imã to reach Cabinda city, and continue from there via Landana, Buco Zau, Belize, Cabinda to Miconge, where it would connect with the rail network of Congo Brazzaville. This line would be 950 kilometres in length.

In an earlier document from the transport ministry, there was a border crossing to DRC planned further up-stream, where the Congo River is not so wide and where the DRC/Angola border moves away from the riverbank, i.e. at Noqui (Angola) and Matadi (DRC).

=== Link with Zambia ===
This would branch off the Benguela railway at Luacano and go south-east via Lago Dilolo, Sapito, Moxico, Samucal, Cazombo, Camanga, and Calunda to Macango, where it would link to the line serving a mine at Lumwana in Zambia. This line would be about 306 km long. A feasibility study is pending.

=== Western link to Namibia ===
This link of probably 343 km would start from the Moçâmedes railway (CFM) at Cuvango and to south via Cassai, Xamutete, Cuvelai, Mupa, Evale, Ondjiva to Namacunde, where it would connect with the Namibian line Tsumeb to Oshikango. This link had also been discussed during a state visit of the Angolan president to Windhoek in Namibia in October 2007. A feasibility study is pending.

=== Extension of the Luanda railway to Saurimo ===
The Luanda railway would be extended beyond Malanje by 527 km via Caculama, Xá Muteba, Capenda, Camulemba, Cacolo, to Saurimo in Lunda Sul province. There it would link with the Eastern north–south line, specified in the next section. A feasibility study is pending.

=== Transversal do Leste (Eastern transversal) ===
This new line would extend 1353 km from north to south, beginning at the border with the DRC at Chitato, then via Luachimo, Dundo, Camissombo and Lucapa to Saurimo where it would connect with the planned new endpoint of the Luanda railway, then via the line under construction since January 2026 to Camanogue and Luena on the Benguela railway, then onto Lucusse, Cassamba, Cangombe and Lupire to Cuito Cuanavale where it would connect with the planned new endpoint of the Moçâmedes railway (CFM), and then via Mavinga to Mucusso on the Okavango river, where it would connect to the Tsumeb – Caprivi line in Namibia. A feasibility study is pending.

=== Extension of the Moçamedes railway to Cuito Cuanavale ===
This would extend the existing line by about 180 km beyond the current end point Menongue via Longa to Cuito Cuanavale where it would connect with the Transversal do Leste. A feasibility study is pending.

=== Transversal Norte-Sul (North-South transversal) ===
This central north–south line of 896 km in length would start at Uíge, from the planned Congo railway going south from there via Negage, Camabatela, Luinga, and Calandula to Malanje, the current end point of the Luanda railway, and then from there further south via Cangandala, Mussende, Calussinga, Andulo, and Cuhinga to Kuito, where it would connect with the existing Benguela railway, and from there via Chitambo and Cuvango, where it would connect with the existing Moçâmedes railway and the planned new line to Oshikango in Namibia. A feasibility study is pending.

=== Interconnection of the three historic lines ===
This new line of 589 km would start as an extension of the existing Dondo branch of the Luanda railway, and go south via Quibala and Waco Kungo to Huambo, connecting there to the existing Benguela railway, continuing further south via Cuima to Cuvango, where it would connect, like the Transversal Norte-Sul, to the existing Moçâmedes railway and the planned new line to Oshikango in Namibia. A feasibility study is pending.

This line would create a direct rail link from the capital Luanda to Angola's second city Huambo and to Namibia.

=== Implementation ===
In April 2023 the Angolan government confirmed funding to build a new 260km railway from Luena on the Benguela Railway to Saurimo, the capital of Lunda Sul province. The project includes eleven bridges and eight railway stations and construction began in January 2026, expected to take five years.

== See also ==
- Angolan Civil War
- Benguela railway
- History of rail transport in Angola
- Luanda Railway
- Moçâmedes Railway
- Transport in Angola
