= Carolina Cerqueira =

Angolan politician

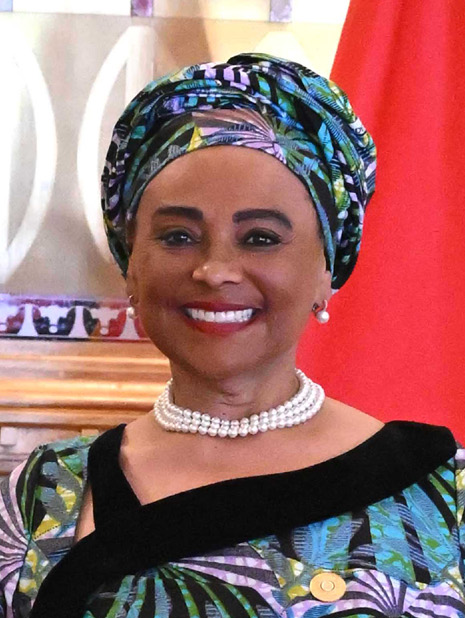
- Cerqueira in 2025

President of the National Assembly
- In office 15 September 2022 – 17 November 2025
- Preceded by: Fernando da Piedade Dias dos Santos
- Succeeded by: Adão Francisco Correia de Almeida

Angola State Minister for Social Affairs
- In office 2019–2022

Minister of Culture of Angola
- In office 2016–2019

Minister of Social Communication of Angola
- In office 2010–2012
- Preceded by: Manuel Rabelais
- Succeeded by: José Luís de Matos

Personal details
- Born: October 20, 1956 (age 70) Caculo Cabaça, Banga, Cuanza Norte

Carolina Cerqueira is an Angolan politician. She is a former State Minister for Social Affairs and a member of the Popular Movement for the Liberation of Angola. Since November 2022, she has been the first female President of the National Assembly. Cerqueira was born in Caculo Cabaça in the municipality of Banga in Cuanza Norte Province in Angola.

She completed her master's degree in Political Sciences Law at Agostinho Neto University in 2008. She served as the Vice President of the Pan African Women 's Organization for Southern Africa between 2013 and 2016, she was the Vice President Parliamentary Group of MPLA 2008-2010, she was elected as the Deputy to the National Assembly during 2012-16, she was a Member of the Permanent Committee, and she was a Member of the Committee on Legal and Constitutional Affairs. She was a member of the Executive Committee and the Sustainable Development Committee, Finance and Trade of the World Inter - Parliamentary Union in 2015.

Cerqueira is recognized internationally for her veteran effort for 30 years in promoting democracy, women's rights, and peace promotion. She was an election observer in the first multiparty elections in Namibia and South Africa. She is acclaimed for her diplomatic handling of the formula of the Statute of Journalists Act, promoting a broad national debate, and effectively handling press and media.

== Early life ==
Cerqueira was born in Caculo Gourd in the municipality of Banga in Cuanza Norte Province in Angola. She completed her master's degree in Political Sciences Law at Agostinho Neto University in 2008 and served as a Jurist. She attended the Diplomatic Journalism Course at the UN Headquarters in New York City, training in People 's Diplomacy at the University of Salento, Italy, training in electoral observation in the European Union Headquarters in Brussels and Ghana and a training in Conflict Resolution in Kenya. She was a member of the International Federation of Women advocating Legal Career, member of the Association of Angolan Women Careers Legal, member of the WCO, member of the Eminent Women Committee African and a member of Assises d 'UNESCO Afrique. While Portuguese is her mother tongue, she knows English, French and understands Spanish.

== Career ==
She started her career as a journalist in National Radio of Angola (RNA) and worked there from 1977 to 1984. She continued as a Secretary for Legal Affairs and WCO Solidarity during the period and also as the Director of Citizenship Office and Society between 1984 and 2008. She was the Chairman of the General Meeting of the International Federation of Women in Legal Careers during 2006-12 and member of the Constitutional Commission of the CRA in 2010. She was deputed the Minister of Social Communication during 2010-12. During the period of 2012-16, she served as the Chairman of the Commission on Human rights, suggestions and Complaints, and as the President of the National World IPU Group. She served as the Vice President of the Pan African Women 's Organization for Southern Africa between 2013 and 2016, while she was the Vice President Parliamentary Group of MPLA 2008-2010, while she was elected as the Deputy to the National Assembly during 2012-16, Member of the Permanent Committee and Member of the Committee on Legal and Constitutional Affairs. She was a member of the Executive Committee and the Sustainable Development Committee, Finance and Trade of the World Inter - Parliamentary Union in 2015. She was deputed as the Minister of Culture in 2016. She was elected from Luanda Province in the Parliamentary elections.

== International relations ==
Cerqueira is recognized internationally for her veteran effort for 30 years in promoting democracy, women's rights and peace promotion. She is considered a champion of peaceful conflict resolution and worked in the capacity of senior manager of the Organization African women for 20 years. As an ambassador of Angola, she represented the nation in various international conferences on peace, development and gender equality. She has also been a facilitator to establish links between NGOs and specific arms of United Nations projects. She was an election observer in the first multiparty elections in Namibia and South Africa. She was representing Angola in Interparliamentary Union and stressed that Angola was a top ten country in terms of gender equity. She is acclaimed for her diplomatic handling of the formula of the Statute of Journalists Act, promoting a broad national debate and effectively handling press and media.
