= 2026 Kifula gold mine landslide =

Natural disaster in Angola

- Canacassala (Angola)
- Date: May 23, 2026
- Time: 03:00 (WAT) (Note: According to a local quoted by Jornal de Angola, the incident occurred at around 05:00 local time, while a survivor told Lusa News Agency that the landslide happened at around 03:00.)
- Location: Kifula, Canacassala, Nambuangongo, Bengo Province, Angola; approx. 08°12′40″S 14°07′39″E
- Deaths: 28
- Injuries: 3

Early on 23 May 2026, a landslide struck an unauthorized gold mining operation in the locality of Kifula, Canacassala, Nambuangongo, Bengo Province, Angola, killing 28 people. Four people were rescued. It is one of the deadliest illegal mining accidents in the history of Angola.

== Background ==
Angola has a mining industry and is the third-largest producer of diamonds in Africa. The nation's Artisanal and Small-Scale Mining (ASM) sector also produces gold, diamond and dimension stone. Under Angolan law, ASM gold can only be sold through licensed buyers, leading to the smuggling of gold from unlicensed mining operations into neighbouring countries. An estimated 7,000 illegal gold miners are extracting minerals in Bengo Province alone, according to authorities.

On 17 March 2019, 13 gold miners working at an unauthorized artisanal gold mine were killed after the mine collapsed in the locality of Chicuele, Sangueve, Chipindo Municipality, Huíla Province. No survivors were reported. Around a month later, heavy rain and landslides killed two more workers in the same area, both working in illegal gold mines.

There have also been many previous mining disasters in the nation, such as an incident in June 2025 where over the course of three days, six people died in mining incidents across Huambo. Other fatal collapses have been reported in Bié, Lunda Norte, and Huambo, all linked to illegal mining operations in those areas.

== Landslide ==
At around 3:00am on the morning of 23 May, a landslide occurred at an illegal gold mining site in the forest of Nova Luanda, near the locality of Kifula, Canacassala, Bengo Province. The landslide collapsed on makeshift and improvised structures, killing 28 gold mine workers, mostly men. According to an eyewitness, around 60–70 people were at the scene immediately after it happened. The cause of the landslide is not explicitly stated.

== Aftermath ==
Emergency teams, rescue groups and local officials were the first to respond to the landslide. Three people received treatment at the nearby hospital of Bengo Central. The Civil Fire Protection and Fire Service of Bengo were monitoring the search and rescue for those initially unaccounted for, until the operations finished on 25 May. Catholic bishop Mauricio Camuto, expressed grievances and empathized with the victims, also saying that the Angolan government should try and "curb the phenomenon."

=== Victims ===
The fatalities identified include a family of 13, with the ages for all victims ranging from 16 to 35 years old. Other sources say the victims' age range were from 18 to 40 or 45 years old.

== See also ==
- 2026 Rubaya mines collapses
- Catoca diamond mine
- List of landslides
