= Operation Esmeralda =

- Part of Portuguese Colonial War and Angolan War of Independence
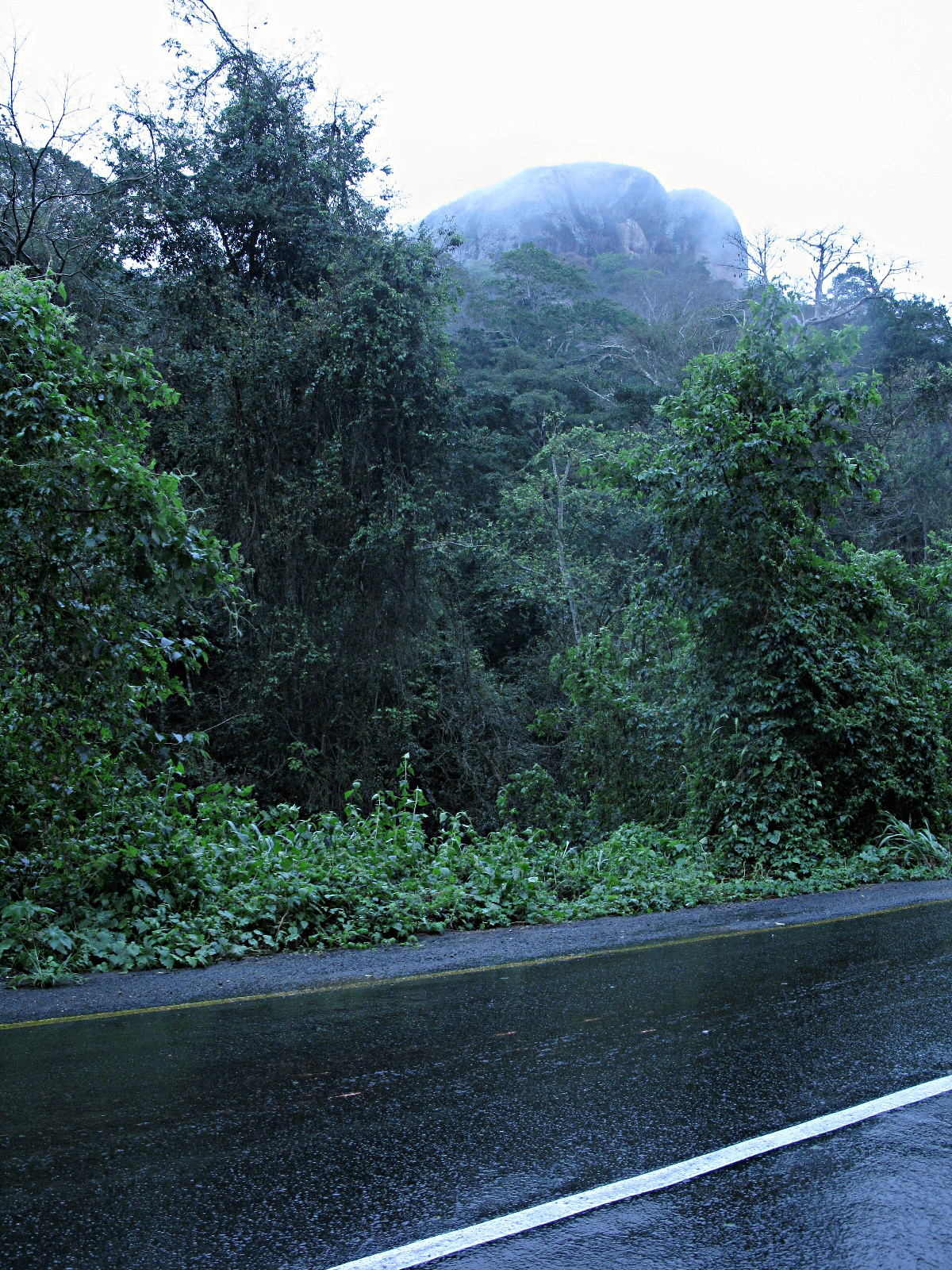
- Pedra Verde peak in Dande.
Date	13 September 1961 – 7 October 1961
Location	Dembos, Portuguese Angola
Result	Portuguese victory

Belligerents
Portugal	UPA

Commanders and leaders
(Portugal) Oliveira Rodrigues (Portugal) Armando Maçanita (Portugal) Teixeira de Morais (Portugal) João Prego	Unknown

Units involved
(Portugal) 261th Caçadores Especiais Battalion; (Portugal) 114th Caçadores Battalion; (Portugal) 96th Caçadores Battalion; (Portugal) 4th Caçadores Especiais Company; (Portugal) Artillery Battery No. 147, 3rd Platoon; (Portugal) Field Artillery Group No. 157	Unknown

Operation Esmeralda ("Emerald" in Portuguese) was a military operation carried out by the Portuguese Armed Forces in Angola during the Portuguese Colonial War. Its objective was to recover the Pedra Verde mountain range, where groups of UPA guerrillas had established themselves.

The peak of Pedra Verde is located in a mountainous region surrounded by dense forests, with very difficult access, which is why it was chosen by the UPA as a base of operations after they were expelled from Nambuangongo by the Portuguese Armed Forces as part of Operation Viriato. In Pedra Verde, the guerrillas had built a training camp and even a factory or workshop for the production of handmade weapons, known as canhangulos. The area was considered to be of high strategic value as it was located on the so-called "Coffee Road" (Estrada do Café in Portuguese), which connected Luanda to Carmona (now Uíge) and served numerous coffee plantations in the region. After the reoccupation of Nambuangongo, the Portuguese maintained their momentum, which surprised the guerrillas.

The 114th Caçadores Battalion, commanded by Lieutenant Colonel Henrique de Oliveira Rodrigues, and the 96th Caçadores Battalion, commanded by Lieutenant Colonel Armando Maçanita, had been given the mission of recapturing Nambuangongo when it was occupied by UPA forces. In order to fulfill this objective, three columns were dispatched via three different routes to Nambuangongo, and when the column commanded personally by Lieutenant Colonel Maçanita arrived in Úcua, it obtained information that UPA forces were stationed at Pedra Verde. After reporting this information to the high command, he received orders to reconnoitre the region but was repelled by enemy rifle and machine gun fire. This information was questioned by the command due to the inexperience of the 96th Caçadores Battalion and the fact that, until then, the guerrillas had only used handmade rifles and machetes. To clarify the situation, the command sent the 4th Caçadores Especiais Company, commanded by Luís Artur Carvalho Teixeira de Morais, to reconnoitre the location, as it was the most experienced unit it had.

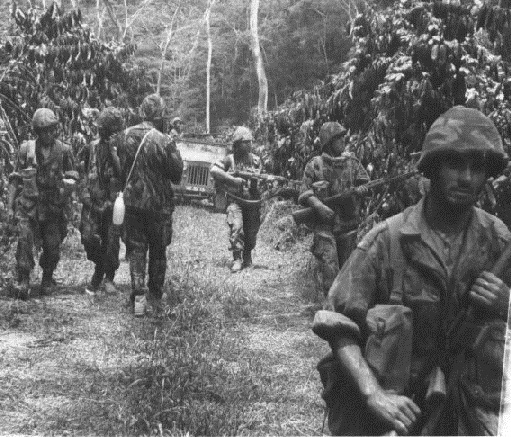
Portuguese troops in the woodlands of northern Angola.

The CCE 4 column left Luanda on 26 July, accompanied by journalists Magalhães Monteiro from Rádio Clube de Moçambique, Artur Peres and Óscar Machado from Emissora Oficial de Angola, Xarula de Azevedo from the newspaper Comércio de Luanda and António Maria Zorra from Moçambique. They reached Úcua that same day. From there, progress could only be made slowly along an open trail, and after three and a half hours of combat between CCE 4 and the guerrillas, the Portuguese retreated due to a shortage of ammunition, having been supported by the 3rd Platoon of the Artillery Battery No. 147 stationed in Úcua. The Portuguese would later learn from UPA POWs that the CCE 4 had inflicted hundreds of casualties on the guerillas.

The mission of recapturing and "cleaning" the region of Pedra Verde was initially attributed the Caçadores Especiais Battalion nº261 commanded by Lieutenant-Colonel João de Madureira Fialho Prego with a paratrooper company, artillery and armored-cars, supported by aviation, however this important force was fought back by the enemy on September 10 with considerable losses.

Operation Esmeralda began on 13 September 1961. Field Artillery Group No. 157 supported the advance of Portuguese troops to Pedra Verde, with its artillery batteries positioned at Roça Quibaba with six 7.5 cm howitzers and two 8.8 cm howitzers, which during the night hit some positions adjacent to Pedra Verde. The Portuguese then advanced on Pedra Verde, which they reached without encountering any resistance on September 16. The Portuguese learnt that enemy forces present there included foreign nationals. Pedra Verde was fully reoccupied on 20 September and the surviving guerrillas joined the approximately 150,000 bacongos who had taken refuge in Congo-Kinshasa, with the UPA launching small attacks from bases established near the border with Angola.

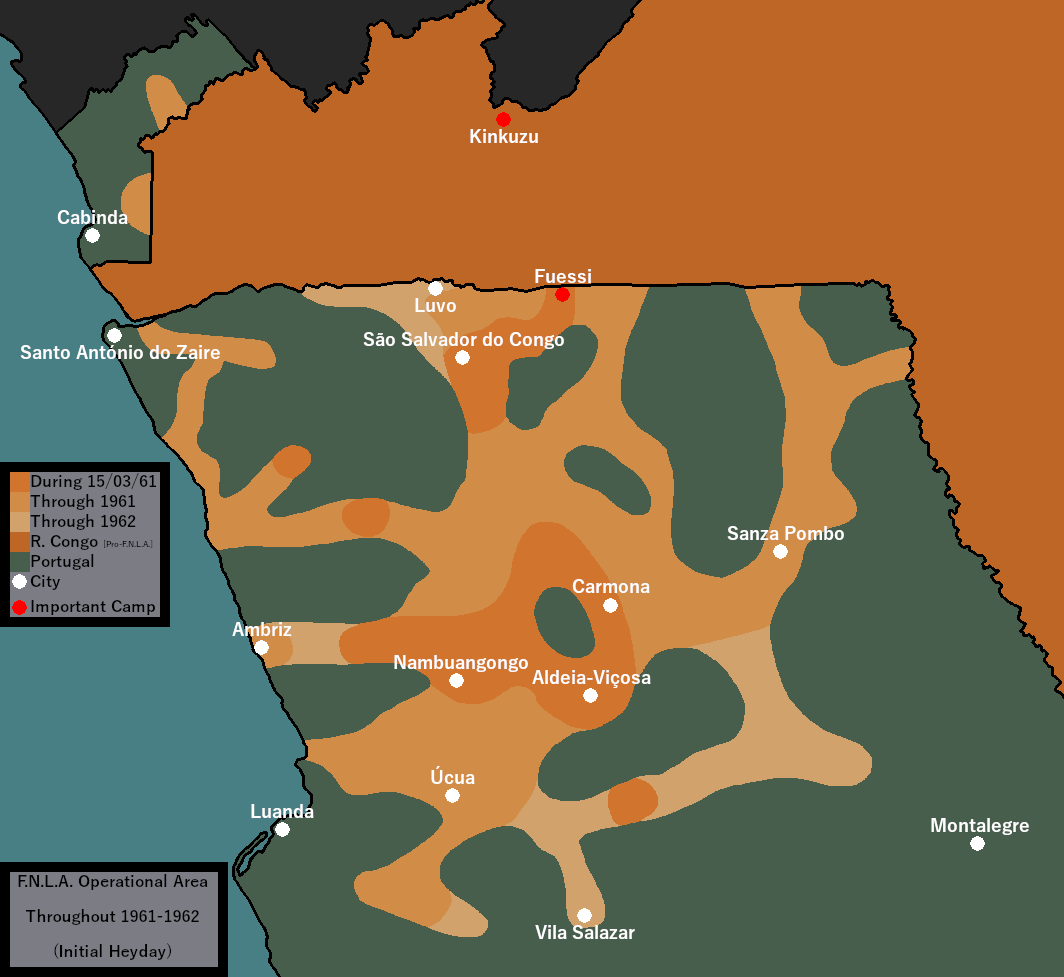
UPA area of operations in northern Angola in 1961-1962.

The Portuguese recaptured the last UPA base on October 3, in Caiongo, which allowed governor Venâncio Deslandes to declare the operation complete a few days later. After the fall of Pedra Verde, Portuguese forces regained control of the territory in the Dembos region where the UPA had established itself. However, this was considered mainly a psychological victory.

== See also ==
- Angolan War of Independence
