= N'dalatando =

N'dalatando Vila Salazar
- Commune
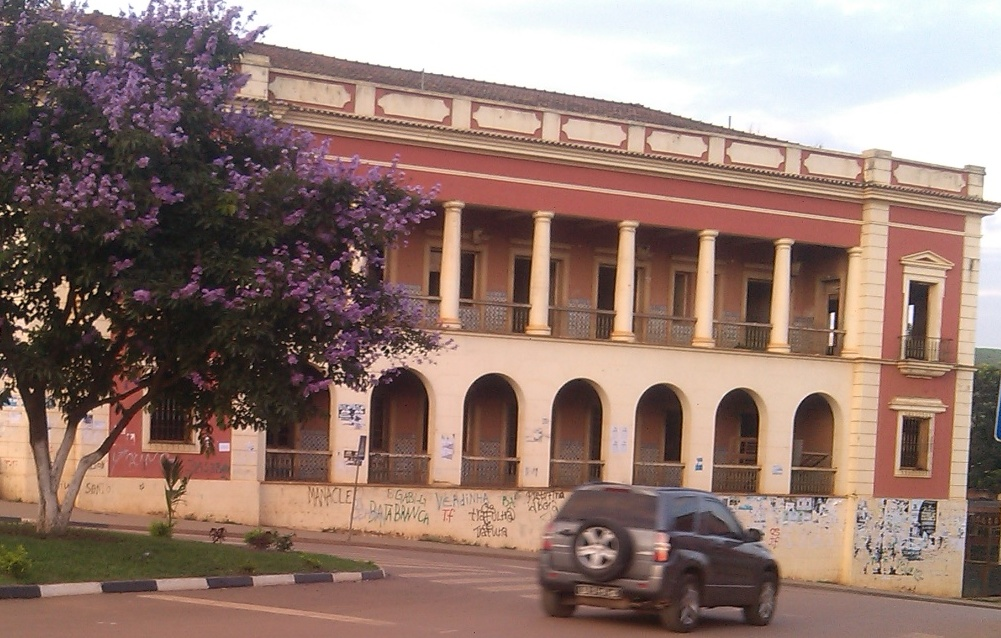

- Location in Angola
- Coordinates: 9°18′S 14°55′E
- Country: Angola
- Province: Cuanza Norte
- Municipality: Cazengo

Area
  - Total: 1,030 km^{2} (400 sq mi)
- Elevation: 670 m (2,200 ft)

Population (2014)
  - Total: 168,832
  - Density: 164/km^{2} (425/sq mi)
- Time zone: UTC+1 (WAT)
- Climate: Aw

N'dalatando, formerly Vila Salazar, is a town, with a population of 161,584 (2014), and a commune in the municipality of Cazengo, province of Cuanza Norte, Angola.

It is also the seat of the Cazengo municipality and the provincial capital.

== History ==
The city is very close to Kabasa which was the historic center of Ndongo, the core kingdom that evolved into the Portuguese colony of Angola.

N'dalatando was named Salazar by the Portuguese colonial authorities in 1936, honoring the Portuguese dictator Salazar. This was later modified to Vila Salazar. On 28 May 1956, the town was elevated to the status of city (cidade in Portuguese). After gaining independence on 11 November 1975, the Angolan government gave it back the name N'dalatando, effective 18 July 1976. The history of the place is traced back to the 1840s.

== Geography ==
The city is limited in the north by the river Luinha, and in the east, south and west by the Lucala River.

== Transportation ==
It is served by a station on the northern railway of Luanda Railway. The national road No. 230 links N'dalatando to Luanda in the West and Malanje in the East.

== Culture ==
The city is home to Angola's là-bas sole botanic garden. The garden was founded as part of a Portuguese agricultural research station and contains some impressive specimens of bamboos, rubber trees, podocarps and fruit trees. The garden also contains a large plantation of tlingera elatior forbs (porcelain roses) for local trade.
