= History of rail transport in Angola =

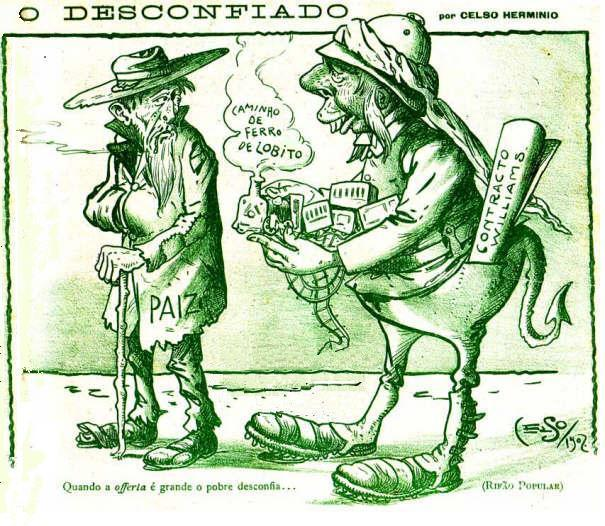
Caricature by Celso Herminio showing the Scottish mining engineer Robert Williams, a contract in his pocket, giving Portugal a railway line in Lobito

Angola railway network 1067mm gauge tracks, 610mm gauge tracks

The history of rail transport in Angola began during the nineteenth century, when Angola was a colony of Portugal. It has involved the construction, operation and destruction of four separate, unconnected, coast-to-inland systems, in two different gauges. Operations on three of those systems have been largely restored; the other system has been closed.

== Beginnings ==
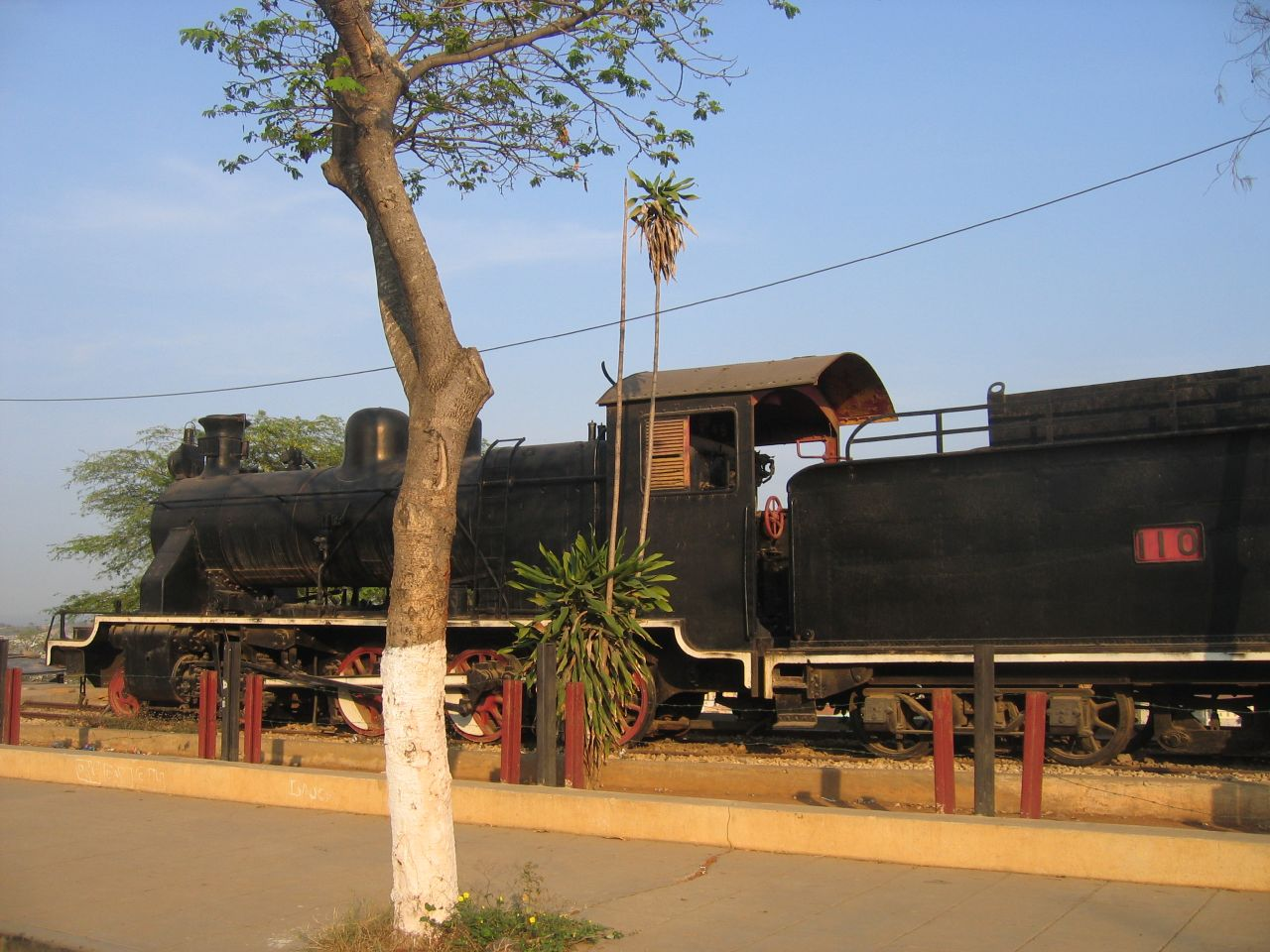
Historic locomotive on Luanda railway line, Angola

Plans to develop Angola by constructing railway lines existed from 1887; and the development of the rail transport began in the colonial period. Two years later, the Luanda Railway (Portuguese: Caminhos de Ferro de Luanda) (Luanda–Viana–Lucala) was built and opened in the north of the colony, at the initiative of a private railway company. By 1909, that line had been extended eastwards to Malanje as a state railway. Later, a branch line was built from Zenza do Itombe to Dondo.

The second significant line, the Moçâmedes Railway (Portuguese: Linha de Moçâmedes), was built as a state railway, in 600 mm (1 ft 11 5/8 in) gauge. The Moçâmedes Railway connects the port city of Moçâmedes, in the south of the colony, with the inland town of Menongue. In 1910, the first section of this line was opened to traffic. Other sections were later built to Dongo and Cassinga before the line was completed to Menongue in 1961. A branch line was built from Lubango to Chiange, making Lubango one of Angola's few rail junctions. The Moçâmedes Railway was regauged to 3 ft 6 in (1,067 mm) gauge in 1950.

== Benguela Railway ==
The Benguela Railway (Portuguese: Caminho de Ferro de Benguela) was completed in 1912, to link the two port cities of Lobito and Benguela with Huambo. This line, in central Angola, included an approximately 2 km (1.2 mi) long rack railway portion, with gradients of up to six percent.

By 1929, the line had been extended to Dilolo, now in the Democratic Republic of the Congo, to enable the copper deposits in the Congolese province of Katanga to be transported to the Atlantic ports. Together with other railway lines, this extended line yielded an almost continuous railway route to Dar es Salaam, in what was then Tanganyika. Only two sections on the 4,000 km (2,500 mi) route were required to be negotiated by ship. Later, it was possible to reach the Mozambican port of Beira by rail.

The Benguela Railway proved to be most important railway line in Angola.

== Other colonial lines ==
A fourth railway line to connect the Angolan inland with a port was built in 1925 to serve coffee plantations on Amboim plateau, in 600 mm (1 ft 11 5/8 in) narrow gauge, and linked Porto Amboim with Gabela. Porto Amboim is on the coast between Luanda and Lobito. The Porto Amboim–Gabela line was managed by the Luanda Railway. It was 130 km (81 mi) long and closed in 1975.

== Post independence ==
On 11 November 1975, Angola became independent. By then, the Angolan civil war had already begun. The civil war lasted until 2002, and brought rail traffic in Angola almost to a standstill. As early as 1975, the Benguela Railway was no longer functional. Several lines, such as the Porto Amboim–Gabela line, were later closed down permanently.

After the end of the civil war, the Angolan government turned to Chinese companies to rehabilitate the three main colonial-era railways. The Luanda Railway and the Benguela Railway were rebuilt by the state-owned China Railway Construction Corporation Limited, while the Moçâmedes Railway was rebuilt by a Chinese mining company.

== See also ==
- History of Angola
- Rail transport in Angola
