= Josefa José =

Politician in Angola

Josefa José (born 1961) is an Angolan politician. She is a Member of the National Assembly of Angola, representing MPLA for Bengo Province.

== Life ==
José was born on 30 July 1961. She gained a BA in sociology.

From 1994 to 2006, José was Provincial Director of the Promotion of Families and Women in Bengo Province. In 2003, she was elected to the Central Committee of the MPLA.

From 2006 to 2011 José was District Administrator for Dande, a municipality in Bengo Province. In 2006 she visited Katanga, a village near Dande, to encourage public health initiatives aimed at combating malaria, diarrhea and polio. In 2007, she was elected First Secretary of the MPLA Municipal Committee in Dembo.

José was elected to the National Assembly in the 2012 Angolan general election. In 2013, as MP for Bengo, she called on parents to encourage children to attend school.
