= Angola train disaster =

The Angola train disaster may refer to:

- The Angola Horror
- The 1994 Tolunda rail disaster
