= Bela Vista, Angola =

Bela Vista
- Commune and town
- Location in Angola
- Coordinates: 7°49′S 13°49′E
- Country: Angola
- Province: Bengo
- Municipality: Ambriz
- Time zone: UTC+1 (WAT)

Bela Vista is a town and commune in the municipality of Ambriz, province of Bengo, Angola. As of 2014, the commune had a population of 4,346 people over an area of 1,620 square kilometres (630 sq mi).

== Notable people ==
- Helena Bonguela Abel, Angolan teacher and politician
