= Tabi (disambiguation) =

Tabi are traditional Japanese socks.

Tabi may also be a romanisation of the Arabic word ʈābiʕ (تابع), meaning "follower", used in English to refer to:

- Tabi‘un, generation of Muslims born after the death of Muhammad
- Tabi‘ al-Tabi‘in, the generation which succeeded them

Tabi may also mean:

- Tabi, Angola, town and commune in Bengo Province, Angola
- Tabi Bonney, Togolese indie musician
- William Etchu Tabi, Cameroonian footballer
- Tabi, a fictional character appearing in a Friday Night Funkin' mod.
