= Bula Atumba =

- Municipality and town
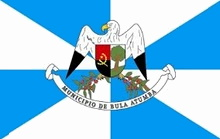
- Flag

- Location in Angola
- Coordinates: 8°28′S 15°15′E
- Country: Angola
- Province: Bengo Province

Population (2024 Census)
  - Total: 36,172
- Time zone: UTC+1 (WAT)

Bula Atumba is a town and municipality in Bengo Province, Angola. It consists of the communes of Bula Atumba (the seat) and Quiage.

In 2024, it had a population of 36,172. It is bordered to the north by the municipality of Quitexe, to the east by the municipality of Banga, to the south by the municipality of Gonguembo, and to the west by the municipalities of Pango Aluquém and Dembos.

== See also ==
- List of municipalities of Angola
