= Tabi, Angola =

Tabi
- Commune and town
- Location in Angola
- Coordinates: 8°11′44.48″S 13°20′46.78″E
- Country: Angola
- Province: Bengo
- Municipality: Ambriz
- Time zone: UTC+1 (WAT)

Tabi is a town and commune in the municipality of Ambriz, province of Bengo, Angola. As of 2014, the commune had a population of 5,382 people over an area of 1,240 square kilometres (480 sq mi).
