= Church of Nossa Senhora da Victoria =

Historic church in Angola

Church of Our Lady of Victoria
- Portuguese: Igreja de Nossa Senhora da Victoria
- Church of Our Lady of Victoria
- 9°37′38.74″S 14°15′18.58″E
- Country: Angola
- Denomination: Roman Catholic Church

Architecture
- Years built: 1583-1590

The Church of Our Lady of Victoria (in Portuguese, Igreja de Nossa Senhora da Victoria) stands near the banks of the Cuanza River in Massanganu, Province of Kwanza-Norte, Angola.

== History ==
This church was the first building outside of the, at that time, village of S. Paulo (Luanda). Its building lasted approximately 7 years, probably between 1583 and 1590. Massanganu was used as a Center of Trade and of military operations in the interior of the Country. It was also used as a religious Center having been elevated to Seat of ecclesiastic Government, between 1641 and 1648, during the netherlander occupation of Luanda. Like many others churches, the Church of Massanganu had some slaves, and it was the local where a lot of them was baptized, or, it was the local where they christianized the black people captured in the Factories (Feitorias) and in the wars organized by the portugueses in order to obtain a bigger number of slaves. It was classified as National Monument by Provincial Decret n. 81, 28 of April of 1928.

== World Heritage Status ==
This site was added to the UNESCO World Heritage Tentative List on November 22, 1996, in the Cultural category.
