= Quicabo =

Quicabo Kikabo
- Commune and town
- Location in Angola
- Coordinates: 8.317825°S 13.832852°E
- Country: Angola
- Province: Bengo
- Municipality: Dande
- Time zone: UTC+1 (WAT)
- Climate: BSh

Quicabo or Kikabo is a town and commune in the municipality of Dande, province of Bengo, Angola. As of 2014, the commune had a population of 12,835 people over an area of 1,420 square kilometres (550 sq mi).
