= Muxaluando =

Muxiluando
- Commune and town
- Location in Angola
- Coordinates: 8.07°S 14.17°E
- Country: Angola
- Province: Bengo
- Municipality: Nambuangongo
- Time zone: UTC+1 (WAT)

Muxaluando is a town and commune in the municipality of Nambuangongo, province of Bengo, Angola.
