= Samba Cajú =

- Municipality
- Location in Angola
- Coordinates: 09°06′S 15°33′E
- Country: Angola
- Province: Cuanza Norte

Population (2014 Census)
  - Total: 21,918
- Time zone: UTC+1 (WAT)
- Climate: Aw

Samba Cajú is a town and municipality in Cuanza Norte Province in Angola. The municipality had a population of 21,918 in 2014.
