= Mabubas =

- Commune and town
- Location in Angola
- Coordinates: 8°32′S 13°42′E
- Country: Angola
- Province: Bengo
- Municipality: Dande
- Time zone: UTC+1 (WAT)
- Climate: BSh

Mabubas is a town and commune in the municipality of Dande, Bengo Province, Angola. As of 2014, the commune had a population of 25,970 people over an area of 2,320 square kilometres (900 sq mi).
