= Bolongongo =

- Municipality and town
- Location in Angola
- Coordinates: 8°28′S 15°15′E
- Country: Angola
- Province: Cuanza Norte Province

Population (2014 Census)
  - Total: 13,019
- Time zone: UTC+1 (WAT)
- Climate: Aw

Bolongongo is a town and municipality in Cuanza Norte Province in Angola. The municipality had a population of 13,019 in 2014.
