= Quiculungo =

- Municipality and town
- Location in Angola
- Coordinates: 8°31′S 15°19′E
- Country: Angola
- Province: Cuanza Norte Province

Population (2014 Census)
  - Total: 9,732
- Time zone: UTC+1 (WAT)

Quiculungo is a town and municipality in Cuanza Norte Province in Angola. The municipality had a population of 9,732 in 2014.
