= Samba Lucala =

Coordinates: 8°59′S 15°35′E

- Commune
- Location in Angola
- Country: Angola
- Province: Cuanza Norte
- Time zone: UTC+1 (WAT)
- Climate: Aw

Samba Lucala is a town and commune of Angola, located in the province of Cuanza Norte.

== See also ==
- Communes of Angola
