= Kicunzo =

- Commune and town
- Location in Angola
- Country: Angola
- Province: Bengo
- Municipality: Nambuangongo
- Time zone: UTC+1 (WAT)

Kicunzo is a town and commune in the municipality of Nambuangongo, Bengo Province, Angola.
