= 1994 Tolunda rail disaster =

1994 Angolan train disaster

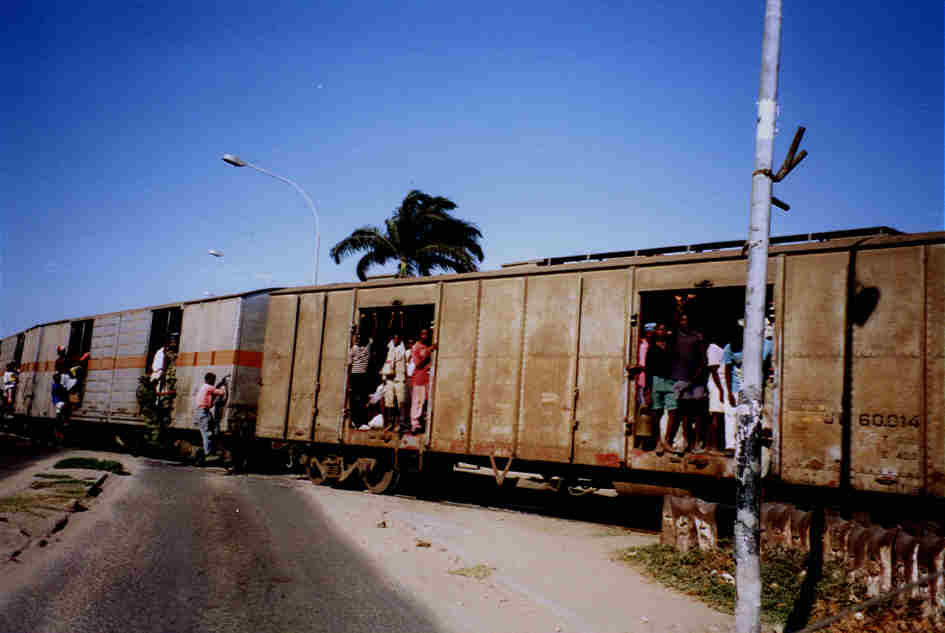
- Example of a 1990s Benguela railway freight train with fare-dodgers

Details
- Date: 22 September 1994
- Location: near Tolunda, Namibe Province
- Country: Angola
- Owner: Benguela railway

Statistics
- Trains: 1
- Passengers: hundreds of fare-dodgers
- Deaths: 300
- Injured: 146-147

The 1994 Tolunda rail disaster happened near Tolunda, in the Namibe Province, Angola on 22 September 1994. A freight train of the Benguela railway derailed due to malfunctioning brakes and crashed into a 10 metres (33 ft) deep ravine. Around 300 people died and 147 more were injured.

It is among the deadliest train disasters in history.

== Background ==
The disaster took place during the Angolan Civil War, but the location of the disaster was largely outside the area of the civil war.

== The disaster ==
On Thursday 22 September 1994 a freight of the Benguela railway was en voyage in Angola with a cargo of granite blocks and with many fare-dodgers onboard. Near Tolunda, in the Namibe Province 190 kilometres from Lubango, the train derailed and crashed into a ten meter deep ravine. The accident location was in a very remote area and as so the rescue operation and other help arrived very late.

Initial sources reported a death toll of 146 people. The final official death toll was published by the Angola Press News Agency a week after the disaster on 29 September. The disaster caused 300 casualties and 146-147 others being injured. Most of the victims were inside the wagons with granite blocks.

The cause of the disaster was malfunctioning of the brakes.

== See also ==
- 2001 Angola train attack
- Transport in Angola
