= Orlando Fortunato de Oliveira =

Angolan film director

- Born: March 20, 1946 (age 80); Benguela
- Citizenship: Angolan
- Education: Catholic University of America
- Occupation: Film director
- Years active: 1989 - Present
- Known for: Comboio de Canhoca (The Train of Cahoca)

Orlando Fortunato de Oliveira (born 1946) is an Angolan film director.

== Life ==
Orlando Fortunato de Oliveira was born on March 20, 1946, in Benguela. He studied sciences and geophysics at the Catholic University of America before turning to cinema.

He filmed Comboio de Canhoca (The Train of Canhoca) in 1989, though for political reasons the film was not released until 2004. In the film, based on a real-life colonial atrocity in the 1950s, Portuguese secret police arrest 59 Angolans, placing them in a train boxcar which is left on a rail siding for three days. As the heat increases, the solidarity of the prisoners break down and they suffer asphyxiation.

== Filmography ==
- Um Caso Nosso [Our case], 1978
- Memoria de um Dia [Memory of a day], 1982
- Festa d’Ilha [Island party], 1985
- Agostinho Neto, 2000
- Comboio de Canhoca [The Train of Canhoca], 2004.
- Batepá [Batter], 2010
