= Kazua =

- Commune and town
- Country: Angola
- Province: Bengo
- Municipality: Pango-Aluquém
- Time zone: UTC+1 (WAT)

Kazua is a town and commune in the municipality of Pango-Aluquém, province of Bengo, Angola.
