= São Pedro da Quilemba =

Coordinates: 9°41′S 14°47′E

- Commune
- Location in Angola
- Country: Angola
- Province: Cuanza Norte
- Time zone: UTC+1 (WAT)
- Climate: Aw

São Pedro da Quilemba is a town and commune of Angola, located in the province of Cuanza Norte.

== See also ==
- Communes of Angola
