= Piri, Angola =

Piri
- Commune and town
- Location in Angola
- Coordinates: 8°31′S 14°25′E
- Country: Angola
- Province: Bengo
- Municipality: Dembos
- Time zone: UTC+1 (WAT)

Piri is a town and commune in the municipality of Dembos, province of Bengo, Angola.
