= Quiage =

Kiaje
- Commune and town
- Location in Angola
- Coordinates: 8°30′S 14°57′E
- Country: Angola
- Province: Bengo
- Municipality: Bula Atumba
- Time zone: UTC+1 (WAT)

Kiaje is a town and commune in the municipality of Bula Atumba, province of Bengo, Angola. As of 2014, the commune had a population of 1,490 people over an area of 365 square kilometres (141 sq mi).
