= Luinga =

- Commune
- Location in Angola
- Coordinates: 8.420341°S 15.629229°E
- Country: Angola
- Province: Cuanza Norte
- Time zone: UTC+1 (WAT)
- Climate: Aw

Luinga is a town and commune of Angola, located in the province of Cuanza Norte. It covers an area of approximately 1,140 square kilometers and, in 2014, had a population density of 13.25 people per square kilometer. The most recent census states the population stands at 15,103

== See also ==
- Communes of Angola
