= São José das Matas =

- Commune and town
- Location in Angola
- Country: Angola
- Province: Bengo
- Municipality: Dembos
- Time zone: UTC+1 (WAT)

São José das Matas is a town and commune in the municipality of Dembos, province of Bengo, Angola.
