= Moçâmedes Railway =

Railway line in Angola

Overview
- Status: Operational
- Locale: Angola
- Termini: Moçâmedes; Menongue

Service
- Type: Heavy rail

History
- Opened: 2015

Technical
- Line length: 860 km (530 mi)
- Track length: 1,003 km (623 mi)
- Track gauge: 1,067 mm (3 ft 6 in)
- Old gauge: 600 mm (1 ft 11 5/8 in)
Angola railway network
3 ft 6 in (1,067 mm) tracks, 610mm gauge tracks
=

The Moçâmedes Railway (Portuguese: Caminho de Ferro de Moçâmedes (CFM)) is an 860 km railway line in Angola, between Moçâmedes and Menongue. The line is operated by the company Caminhos de Ferro de Moçâmedes E.P. The port city of Moçâmedes was renamed Namibe between 1985 and 2016, so the railway was sometimes called the Namibe Railway (Portuguese: Caminho de Ferro do Namibe). However, the railway company retained its original legal name.

Its cargo flow point is made through the port of Namibe.

== History ==
Construction began on the railway in 1905, when Angola was a Portuguese colony. The railway was opened to traffic in 1910, and continued to be extended inland until it reached its current terminus at Menongue (formerly Serpa Pinto) in December 1961. The line was originally built with 600 mm (1 ft 11 5/8 in) narrow gauge track, but it was re-gauged to 3 ft 6 in (1,067 mm) Cape gauge in 1950, matching the gauge of other lines in Angola and southern Africa.

After Angola obtained its independence from Portugal in 1975, the Angolan Civil War broke out, resulting in the destruction of most of Angola's railway infrastructure. When the fighting ended in 2002, the Angolan government sought to restore rail service. The China Hyway Group rebuilt the Moçâmedes Railway between 2006 and 2015.

The railway is expected to serve mines at Chamutete and Cassinga

== See also ==
- Benguela railway
- History of rail transport in Angola
- Luanda Railway
- Rail transport in Angola
