= Zala, Angola =

Zala
- Commune and town
- Location in Angola
- Coordinates: 7°50′S 14°13′E
- Country: Angola
- Province: Bengo
- Municipality: Nambuangongo
- Time zone: UTC+1 (WAT)

Zala is a town and commune in the municipality of Nambuangongo, province of Bengo, Angola.
