= Paredes, Angola =

Paredes
- Commune and town
- Location in Angola
- Coordinates: 8°36′S 14°40′E
- Country: Angola
- Province: Bengo
- Municipality: Dembos
- Time zone: UTC+1 (WAT)

Paredes is a town and commune in the municipality of Dembos, province of Bengo, Angola.
