= Zenza do Itombe =

- commune and town
- Location in Angola
- Coordinates: 9°17′0″S 14°3′0″E
- Country: Angola
- Province: Cuanza Norte
- Municipality: Cambambe
- Time zone: UTC+1 (WAT)
- Climate: Aw

Zenza do Itombe is a town and commune in the municipality of Cambambe, province of Cuanza Norte, Angola.

== Transport ==
It is served by a junction railway station of the Luanda Railway. It was the place of the 2001 Angola train attack.

== Namesake ==
- There is another town in Angola called Zenza.
