= Lucala =

- Municipality and town
- Location in Angola
- Coordinates: 9°38′S 14°04′E
- Country: Angola
- Province: Cuanza Norte Province

Population (2014 Census)
  - Municipality and town: 22,674
  - Urban: 19,422
- Time zone: UTC+1 (WAT)
- Climate: Aw

Lucala is a town and municipality in Cuanza Norte Province in Angola. The municipality had a population of 22,674 in 2014.
