= Pango Aluquém =

- Town & Municipality
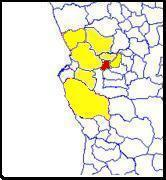
- Municipality of Pango-Aluquém

- Location in Angola
- Coordinates: 08°43′S 14°28′E
- Country: Angola
- Province: Bengo Province

Population (2014 Census)
  - Total: 7,006
- Time zone: UTC+1 (WAT)

Pango Aluquém is a municipality in the province of Bengo, in Angola.

In 2014, it had 7,006 inhabitants. It is bordered to the north by the municipality of Dembos; to the east by the municipalities of Bula Atumba and Gonguembo; to the south by the municipalities of Golungo Alto and Cambambe, and to the west by the municipality of Dande.

The municipality is made up of the headquarters commune, corresponding to the city of Pango Aluquém, and the commune of 7.

== See also ==
- List of municipalities of Angola
