= Canacassala =

Canacassala Kanacassala
- Commune and town
- Location in Angola
- Coordinates: 8°10′S 14°07′E
- Country: Angola
- Province: Bengo
- Municipality: Nambuangongo
- Time zone: UTC+1 (WAT)

Canacassala is a town and commune in the municipality of Nambuangongo, province of Bengo, Angola.
