= Dembos =

- Municipality and town
- Location in Angola
- Coordinates: 8°40′S 14°53′E
- Country: Angola
- Province: Bengo Province

Population (2014 Census)
  - Total: 30,058
- Time zone: UTC+1 (WAT)

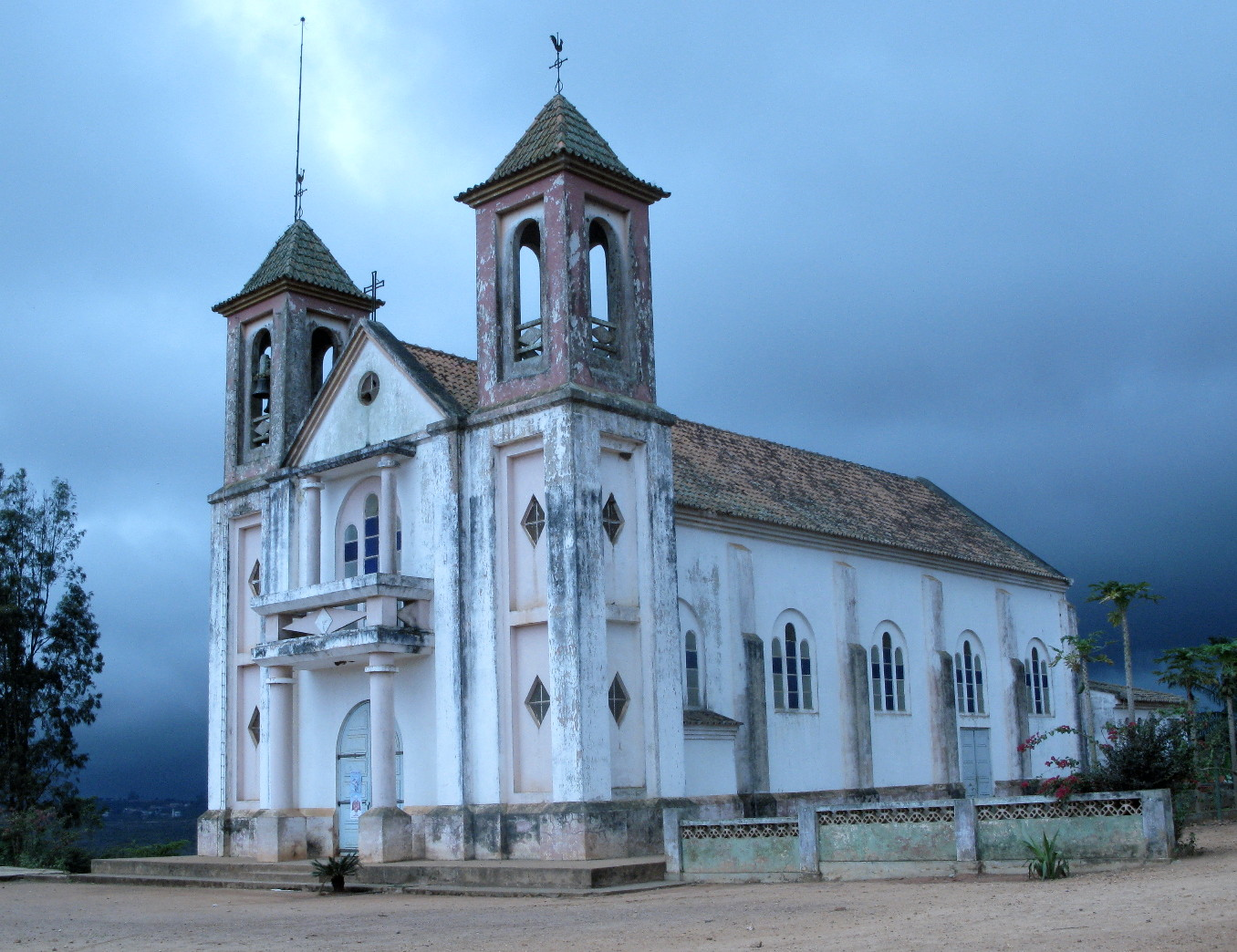
Catholic mission of Dembos

Dembos is a municipality in the Bengo Province of Angola. The municipal seat is the city of Quibaxe. In 2014, it had a population of 28,202. It is bordered to the north by the municipalities of Nambuangongo and Quitexe, to the east by the municipality of Bula Atumba, to the south by the municipality of Pango Aluquém, and to the west by the municipality of Dande.

The municipality is located about 180 kilometers north of the city of Caxito, in the same province, and consists of four communes: Paredes, Piri, Quibaxe, and São José das Matas (formerly Quoxe). The administrator since 2017 has been António Augusto João.

== History ==
The municipality of Dembos was part of the historic Dembos district (the precursor of the current Bengo province) in the 19th century. After the district was dissolved, it became a council in the Cuanza Norte Province, even after national independence on November 11, 1975. It remained attached to that province (the districts became provinces after 1972) until 1980, when it was integrated into the Bengo province. It was elevated to the status of a town in 1921 by decree no. 57.

On July 28, 2016, the municipality celebrated its 95th anniversary. The highlight of the festivities was the inauguration of a water capture, treatment, and distribution system in the municipal seat of Dembos, benefiting the population of the city of Quibaxe and its surroundings. A wreath was also laid, and a traditional ritual was conducted at the source of the Sengue River. Additional activities included a visit to the regional hospital, urban cleaning, an ecumenical service, a fair of various products, an athletics competition, a lecture on "The History of the Dembos Region," Dembos stew, and a cultural night with a fireworks display.

== See also ==
- List of municipalities of Angola
