= Bengo Province =

Province of Angola

Coordinates: 8°47′S 13°59′E

Bengo
- Province
- Logo

- Bengo, province of Angola
- Country: Angola
- Capital: Caxito

Government
  - Governor: Maria Antonia Nelumba
  - Vice-Governor for the Political, Economic and Social Sector: Jose Francisco Bartolomeu Pedro
  - Vice-Governor for Technical Services and Infrastructures: Edson Vaz Camara da Cruz

Area
  - Total: 31,371 km^{2} (12,112 sq mi)

Population (2024 Census)
  - Total: 716,335
  - Density: 22.834/km^{2} (59.141/sq mi)
- ISO 3166 code: AO-BGO
- HDI (2018): 0.565 medium · 6th
- Website: www.bengo.gov.ao

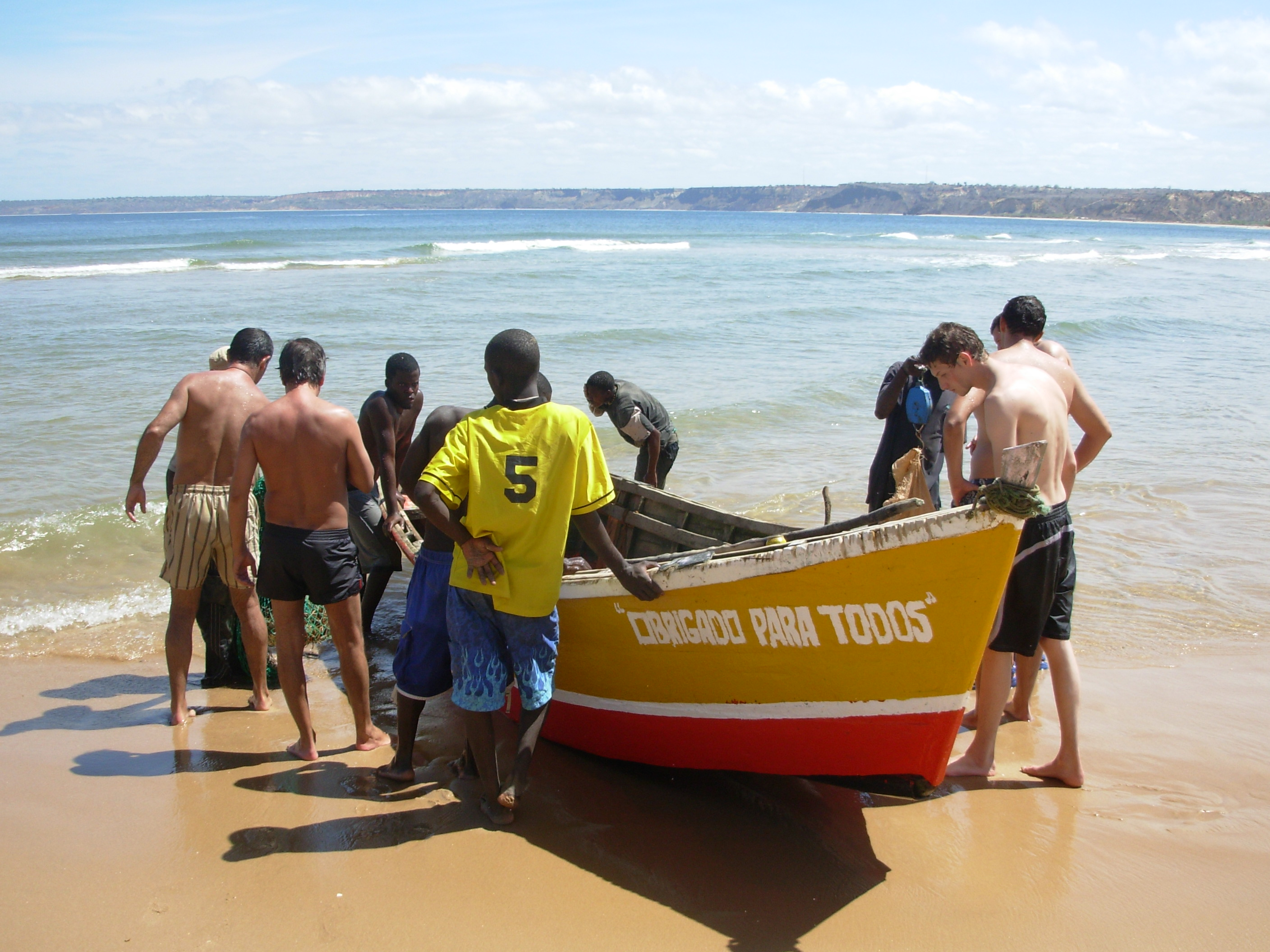
A boat on a beach of Bengo

Bengo is a province of Angola. Its capital is Caxito. It has an area of 31,371 square kilometres, and its population as of the 2014 Census was 356,641. The province was created in 1980 by dividing the original province of Luanda into Bengo and a new smaller province of Luanda.

== Geography ==
The province is bordered by the provinces of Zaire to the North, Uige to the Northeast, Cuanza Norte to the East, and Cuanza Sul to the South. It has two western coastal stretches along the Atlantic Ocean, and forms an enclave around the national capital's province of Luanda. The Kissama National Park and the Kibinda Forest Reserve are here. The province also has a number of lakes, most of them are in the municipalities of Dande and Icolo and Bengo. There are lagoons at Panguila and Ibendoa, Cabiri and Ulua do Sungui.

== Municipalities ==
=== Since the territorial reform of July 2011 ===
The Angolan National Assembly approved a law on July 27, 2011 reorganizing the territorial subdivisions of Luanda and Bengo Provinces .

The law moved the Icolo e Bengo and Quiçama municipalities from Bengo Province to Luanda Province and created new municipalities in both provinces. Now, Bengo Province is divided into six municipalities:

Município	Capital	Area (km2)	Pop. (2006 est)
Ambriz	Ambriz	4,204	16,611
Bula-Atumba	Bula	3,604	56,718
Dande	Caxito	6,529	82,992
Dembos	Quibaxe	2,444	58,941
Nambuangongo	Muxaluando	5,604	110,831
Pango-Aluquém	Pango	2,754	45,680

=== Before the territorial reform of 2011 ===
Bengo Province before the 2011 transfer of two southern municipalities to Luanda Province.

The province of Bengo contained five municipalities (municípios):

Município	Capital	Area (km2)	Pop. (2006 est)
Ambriz	Ambriz	4,204	16,611
Dande	Caxito	6,529	82,992
Ícolo e Bengo	Catete	3,819	58,830
Nambuangongo	Muxaluando	5,604	110,831
Quiçama	Muxima	12,046	29,905

Since 2011, Icolo e Bengo and Quiçama have been moved to Luanda Province.

Some sources show the following municipalities in Bengo Province: Bula-Atumba, Dembos and Pango-Aluquém; while others list those three in Cuanza Norte (Kwanza Norte) province.

== Communes ==
The province of Bengo contains the following communes (comunas), sorted by their respective municipalities:

- Ambriz Municipality:– Ambriz, Bela Vista, Tabi
- Bula-Atumba Municipality: – Bula Atumba, Quiage (Kiage)
- Dande Municipality: – Barra do Dande, Caxito, Mabubas, Quicabo (Kikabo), Úcua
- Dembos Municipality: – Paredes, Piri, Quibaxe (Kibaxe), São José das Matas
- Nambuangongo Municipality: – Cage (Kage), Canacassala (Kanacassala), Gombe, Muxaluando (Muxiluando), Quicunzo (Kicunzo), Quixico (Kixico), Zala
- Pango-Aluquém Municipality: – Cazuangongo (Kazuangongo), Pango-Aluquém
- Ícolo e Bengo Municipality: – Bom Jesus do Cuanza, Cabiri (Kabiri), Caculo Cahango, Calomboloca (seat: Cassoneca), Catete
- Quiçama Municipality: – Cabo Ledo, Demba Chio, Mumbondo, Muxima, Quixinje (Kixinje)

== Natural resources and geology ==
Bengo is known for its abundant fish, with fishing communities along the coast. Late Cretaceous fossils are known from this region, including unique turtles (Angolachelys) and the first dinosaur fossil skeleton from Angola: the Angolatitan.

== List of governors of Bengo ==
Name	Years in office
Manuel Lopes Maria aka Xi Mutu	1980–1987
Francisco Deolindo da Rosa aka Facho	1987–1988
Pedro Benga Lima aka Foguetão	1988–1990
António Ventura de Azevedo	1990–1994
Domingos Hungo aka SKS	1994
Isalino Samuel Mendes	1994–2004
Jorge Inocêncio Dombolo	2004–2009
João Bernardo de Miranda	2009–2018
Mara Baptista Quiosa	2018–

Up to 1991, the official name was Provincial Commissioner

== See also ==
- Fortress of Muxima
