= Luanda Railway =

Railway line in Angola

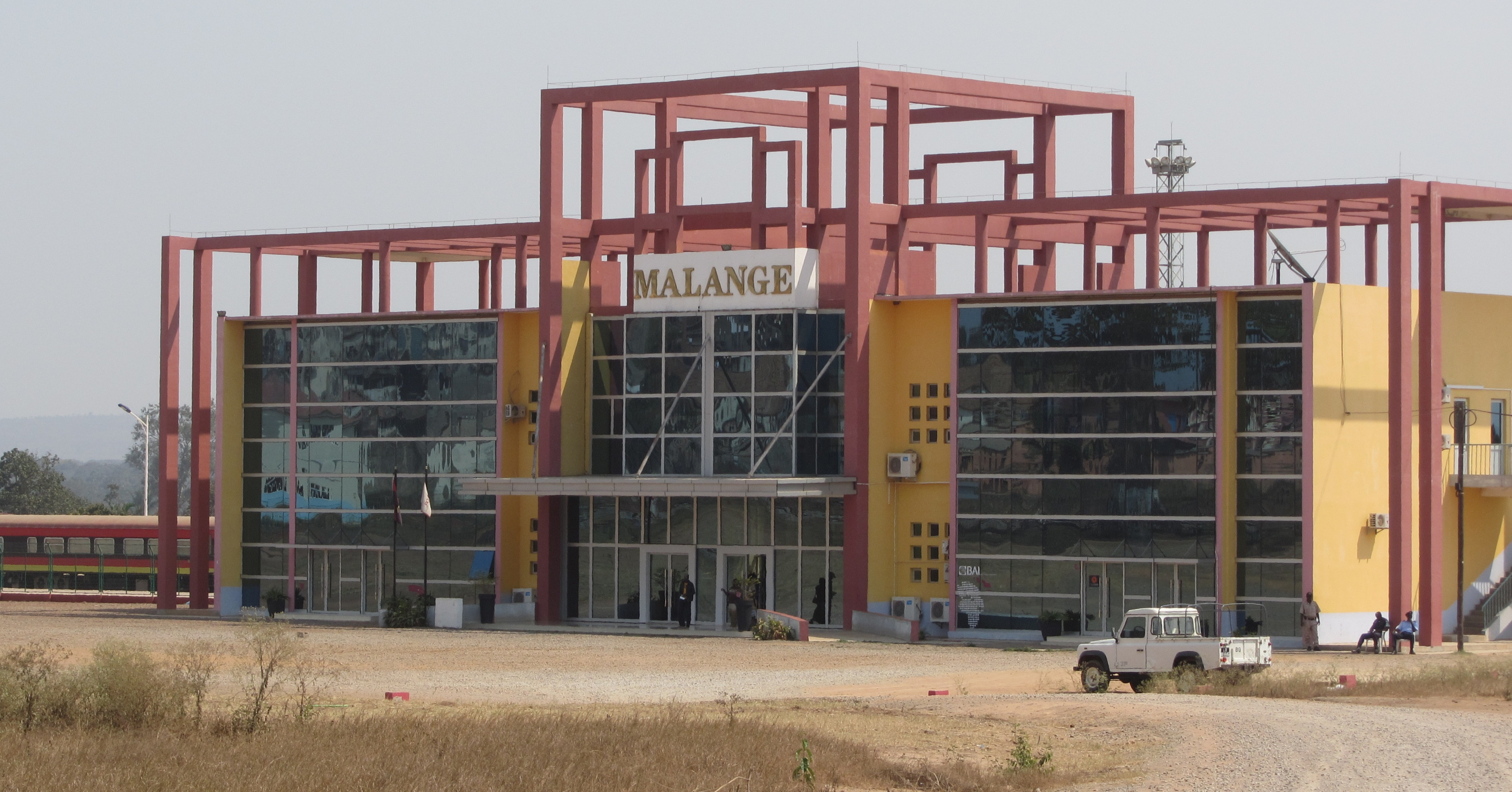
- Malanje station

Overview
- Locale: Northwestern Angola
- Termini: Luanda; Malanje

Technical
- Line length: 424 km (263 mi)
- Track gauge: 1,067 mm (3 ft 6 in)
Angola railway network
1067mm gauge tracks,
610mm gauge tracks

The Luanda Railway (sometimes called Angola Railway) is a 424 km (263 mi) single-track Cape gauge railway line from the Angolan capital of Luanda to Malanje. A branch line departs the railway at Zenza do Itombe for Dondo. The line is operated by the state owned company Caminho de Ferro de Luanda E.P., short CFL EP.

== History ==
From its terminal at the Atlantic port of Luanda, the railway heads inland towards Eastern Angola, but ends in the middle of the country at Malanje. A branch line departed the railway at Zenza do Itombe for Dondo.

The coastal segment from Luanda to Lucala was built by a Portuguese company in 1889. The line was then extended to Malanje in 1909 by the Portuguese government. After independence from Portugal in 1975, the Angolan civil war broke out. In 2001, the Luanda Railway was one of the only functioning railways in Angola, when it was hit by a bomb attack, killing 91 people. The prolonged fighting lasted until 2002 and destroyed most of the railway infrastructure in Angola.

In 2005, a $355 million rehabilitation project was begun by the China Railway 20 Bureau Group, with funding from the China International Fund. A total of 215 km of rails were rehabilitated, and another 264 km of new rails were laid. The project included the construction of 16 stations, 16 bridges, and 200 culverts.

== Resumption of services ==
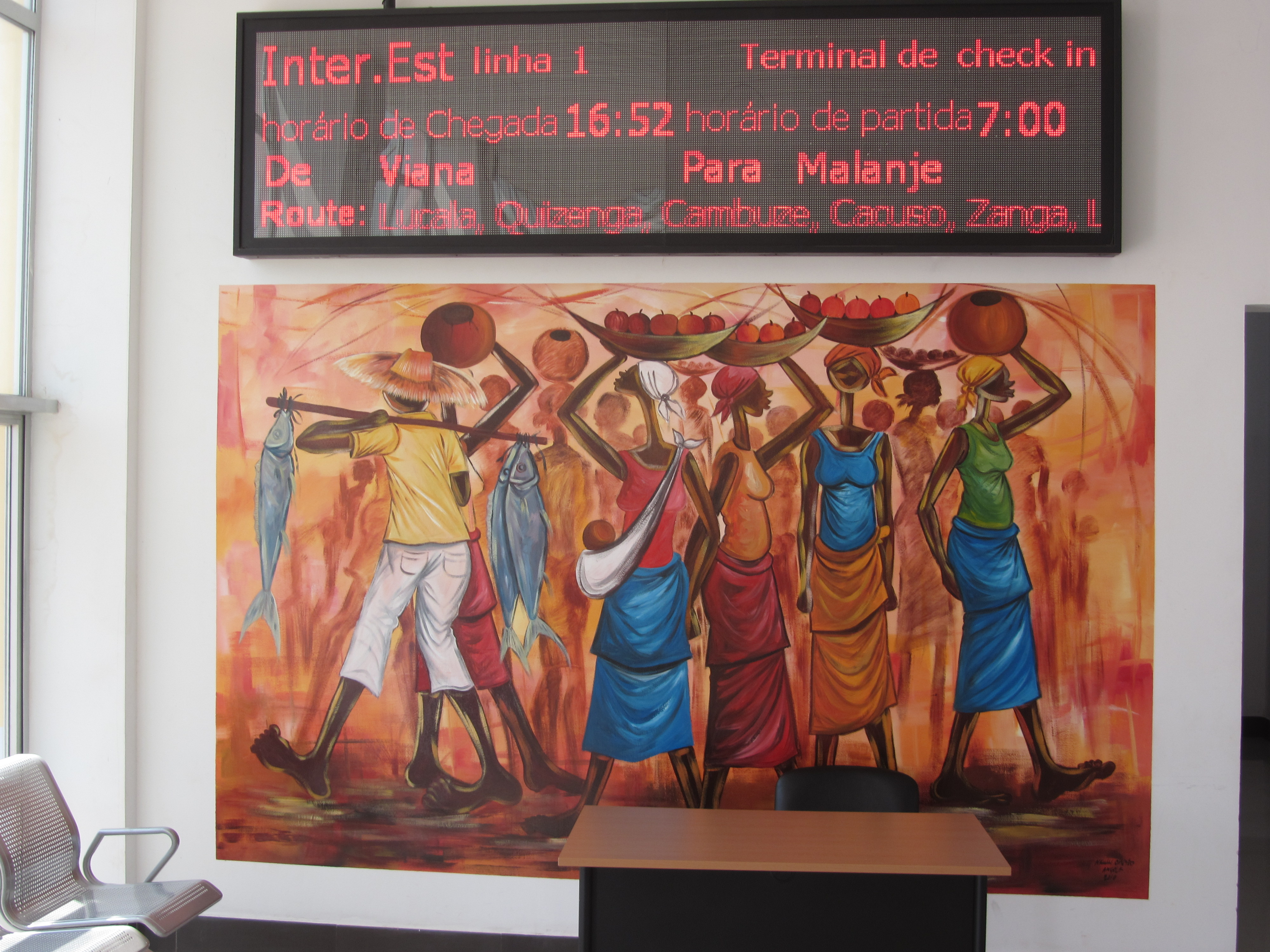
Arrivals in Malanje on a Wednesday in August 2011

In 2010, a passenger service resumed between Luanda and Malanje; Angola's Deputy Minister of Transport, José João Kuvingwa suggested that full operation could resume in 2011. In July 2010, a twice-weekly freight service began, between Dondo and Luanda. In November 2010, CFL announced hourly passenger trains between Viana and Textang; in December 2010, container services commenced, serving a dry port near Viana, and in January 2011 the first train reached Malanje.

Most of the trains run on the suburban stretch from Luanda to Viana and further to Catete. Trains on this service were carrying about 15 000 passengers per day as of 2015.

Regular services between Luanda and Malanje started in January 2011. One train per day is working the line, either up, i.e. from Luanda to Malanje, or down (return). The long distance trains start and end at Viana.

In mid-July 2011, the CFL announced the introduction of electronic ticketing on an experimental basis for inter-provincial journeys, beginning on 18 July.

== Crashes and incidents ==
In 2011, 34 people died from 70 crashes and incidents on the suburban stretch between the Luanda, Viana and Icolo e Bengo municipalities, most of them in cases where drivers or pedestrians tried to cross the line at illegal crossings, said CFL marketing director Francisco Henriques to Angop. After 18 years of interruption of railway traffic, there is a whole generation who has no experience at all interacting with railways and trains.

On 18 February 2012, the rail line was interrupted for at least two days when a truck crashed into a passenger train at a level crossing in the locality "Cabebeia", in município de Kambambe (provínce Kwanza Norte). The locomotive derailed completely, and two railway cars were damaged.

On 22 July 2026, a freight train derailed between Quinzenza in Malanje Province and Lucala in Cuanza-Norte, involving a locomotive and a tanker wagon. No injuries were reported. The rail services were suspended while repairs were carried out, with service restored on 30 July 2026, eight days after the incident.

== See also ==
- Benguela railway
- History of rail transport in Angola
- Moçâmedes Railway
- Railway stations in Angola
- Rail transport in Angola
- Template:Suburban railways in Africa
