= Ngonguembo =

Gonguembo
- Municipality
- Location in Angola
- Coordinates: 8°59′S 14°56′E
- Country: Angola
- Province: Cuanza Norte

Area
  - Total: 1,400 km^{2} (540 sq mi)

Population (2014)
  - Total: 7,576
  - Density: 5.4/km^{2} (14/sq mi)
- Time zone: UTC+1 (WAT)

Gonguembo, also NGonguembo, is a town and municipality in Cuanza Norte Province in Angola. The population is 7,576 as of 2014 in an area of 1,400 km^{2}. The municipality consists of the communes Camame, Cavunga and NGonguembo (Quilombo dos Dembos).
