= Úcua =

Coordinates: 8°39′41.8″S 14°8′54.6″E

- Commune and town
- Location in Angola
- Country: Angola
- Province: Bengo
- Municipality: Dande
- Time zone: UTC+1 (WAT)

Úcua is a town and commune in the municipality of Dande, province of Bengo, Angola.
