= Caculo Cabaça =

- Municipality
- Country: Angola
- Province: Cuanza Norte

Area
  - Total: 181.6 sq mi (470.4 km^{2})

Population (2024 census)
  - Total: 3,439
- Time zone: UTC+1 (WAT)
- Climate: Aw

Caculo Cabaça is a town and municipality of Angola, located in the province of Cuanza Norte. The municipality had a population of 3,439 in 2024.

During the 16th and 17th centuries, it was a large city named Kabasa, which served as the capital of the Kingdom of Ndongo.

== See also ==
- Municipalities of Angola
