= Dande =

- Municipality, commune and town
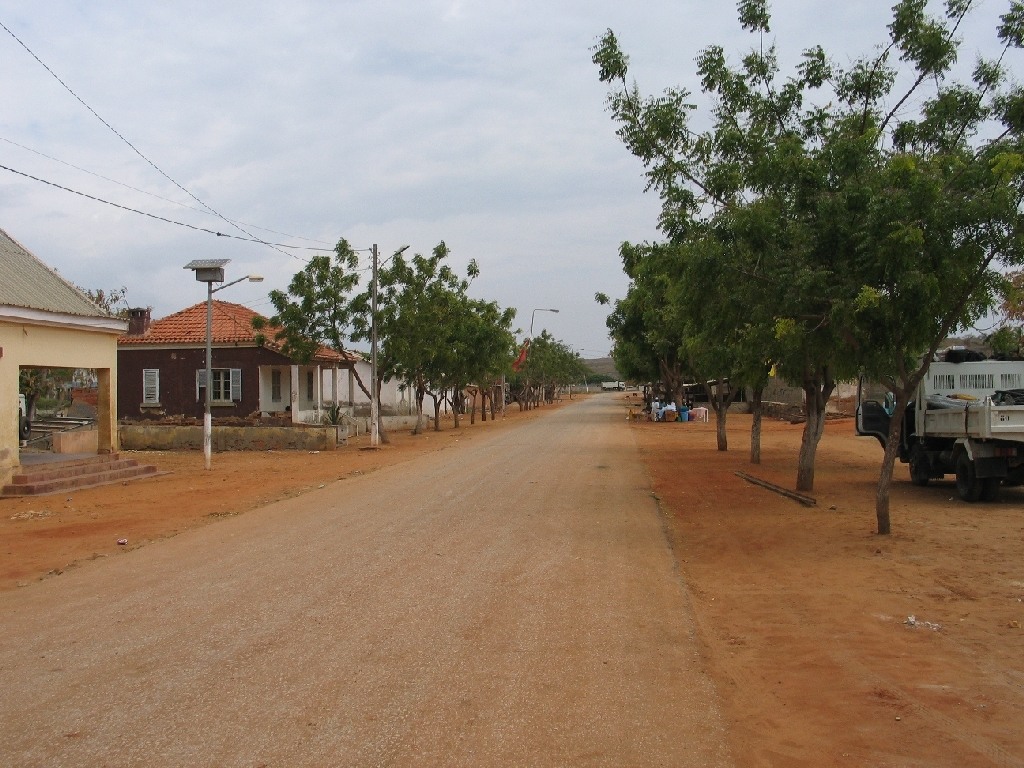
- Road through Barra do Dande

- Location in Angola
- Coordinates: 8°28′22″S 13°22′23″E
- Country: Angola
- Province: Bengo Province

Area
  - Total: 1,237 sq mi (3,203 km^{2})

Population (2024 Census)
  - Total: 145,798
  - Density: 117.9/sq mi (45.52/km^{2})
- Time zone: UTC+1 (WAT)

Dande is a municipality in the Bengo Province of Angola, with its seat in the city of Caxito. It is the capital municipality of the said province.

In 2024, it had 145,798 inhabitants. It is bordered to the north by the municipalities of Ambriz and Nambuangongo, to the east by the municipalities of Dembos and Pango Aluquém, to the south by the municipalities of Cambambe and Ícolo e Bengo, and to the west by the municipality of Cacuaco and the Atlantic Ocean.

As of 2019, the municipality consists of the central commune, corresponding to the city of Caxito, and the communes of Barra do Dande, Mabubas, Quicabo, and Úcua.

== Culture and Leisure ==
Within the municipal territory, the Quianda Festival is held at the Ibendoa Lagoon, associated with the worship of Quianda.

== See also ==
- List of municipalities of Angola
