= Cazengo =

- Municipality and town
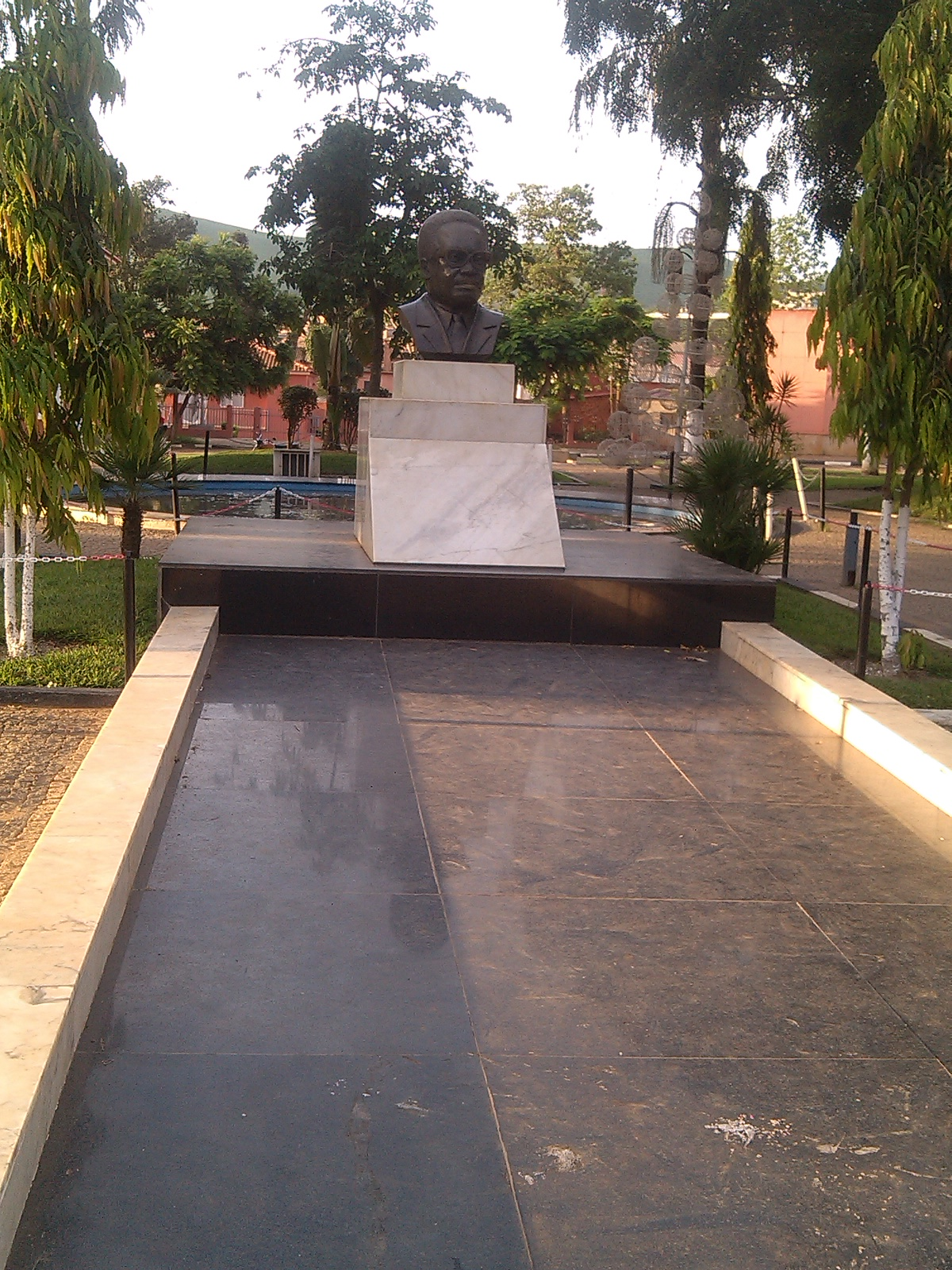

- Location in Angola
- Coordinates: 9°18′S 14°57′E
- Country: Angola
- Province: Cuanza Norte Province

Area
  - Total: 696 sq mi (1,803 km^{2})

Population (2024 Census)
  - Total: 248,171
  - Density: 356.5/sq mi (137.6/km^{2})
- Time zone: UTC+1 (WAT)

Cazengo is a town and municipality in Cuanza Norte Province in Angola. The municipality had a population of 248,171 in 2024.
