= Banga, Angola =

Banga
- Municipality and town
- Location in Angola
- Coordinates: 08°44′S 15°10′E
- Country: Angola
- Province: Cuanza Norte

Population (2014 Census)
  - Total: 10,354
- Time zone: UTC+1 (WAT)
- Climate: Aw

Banga is a town and municipality in the Cuanza Norte Province of Angola. The municipality had a population of 10,354 in 2014.
