= 2001 Angola train attack =

Incident during the Angolan Civil War

- Location: Angola
- Date: 10 August 2001; 25 years ago
- Deaths: 252
- Injuries: 165
- Perpetrator: UNITA

The 2001 Angola train attack was an attack during the Angolan Civil War when on 10 August 2001 UNITA forces derailed a train travelling between towns of Zenza and Dondo with an anti-tank mine and then attacked the passengers with small arms fire.

== History ==
The Angolan Civil War had been going on since 1975 and was a legacy of the Cold War. As part of its ongoing efforts to overthrow the government, the 2001 Angola train attack occurred on 10 August 2001 when a passenger train in Angola hit an anti-tank mine placed on the track by National Union for the Total Independence of Angola (UNITA) rebels. After its derailment, rebels attacked the passengers with gunfire, killing around 250 people of the 500 who were on the train. The attack took place about 150 kilometres (93 mi) south-east of the capital, Luanda. On 16 August 2001, members of the United Nations Security Council strongly condemned the attack, calling it a "terrorist attack".

On 13 August, UNITA took responsibility for the attack.

== See also ==
- Angolan Civil War
- Transport in Angola
- List of terrorist incidents involving railway systems
