= Dondo, Angola =

Dondo
- Commune and town
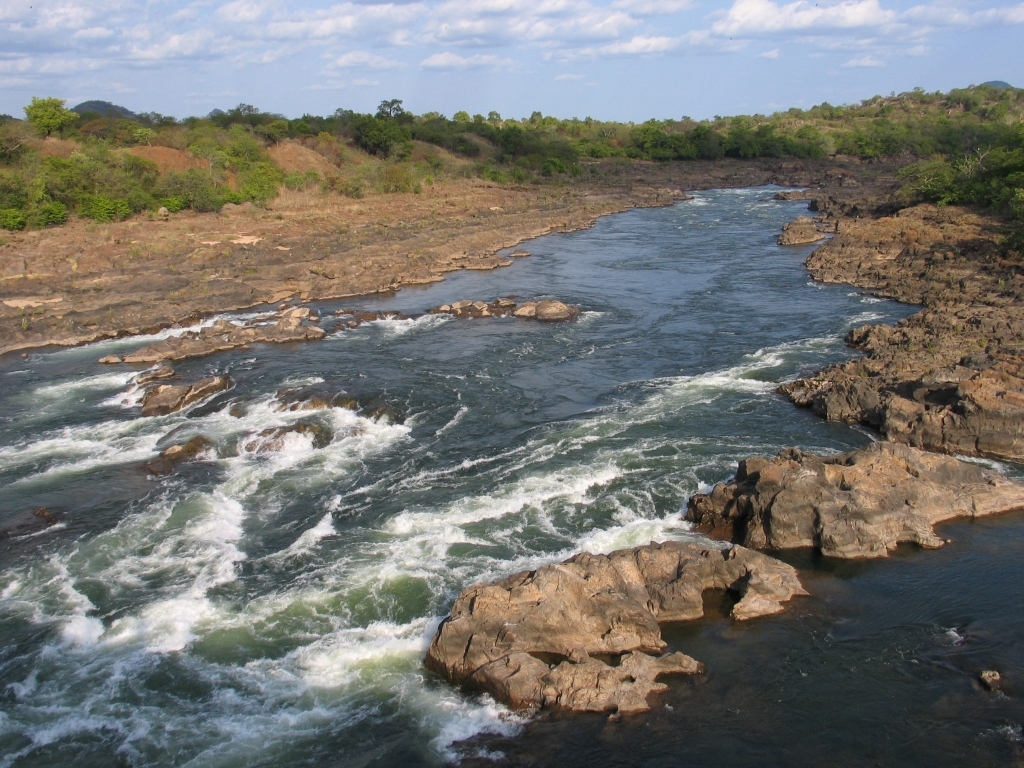
- Kwanza river near Dondo

- Location in Angola
- Coordinates: 9°41′39″S 14°25′22″E
- Country: Angola
- Province: Cuanza Norte
- Municipality: Cambambe

Area
  - Total: 297 sq mi (768 km^{2})

Population (2014)
  - Total: 71,715
  - Density: 242/sq mi (93.4/km^{2})
- Time zone: UTC+1 (WAT)
- Climate: Aw

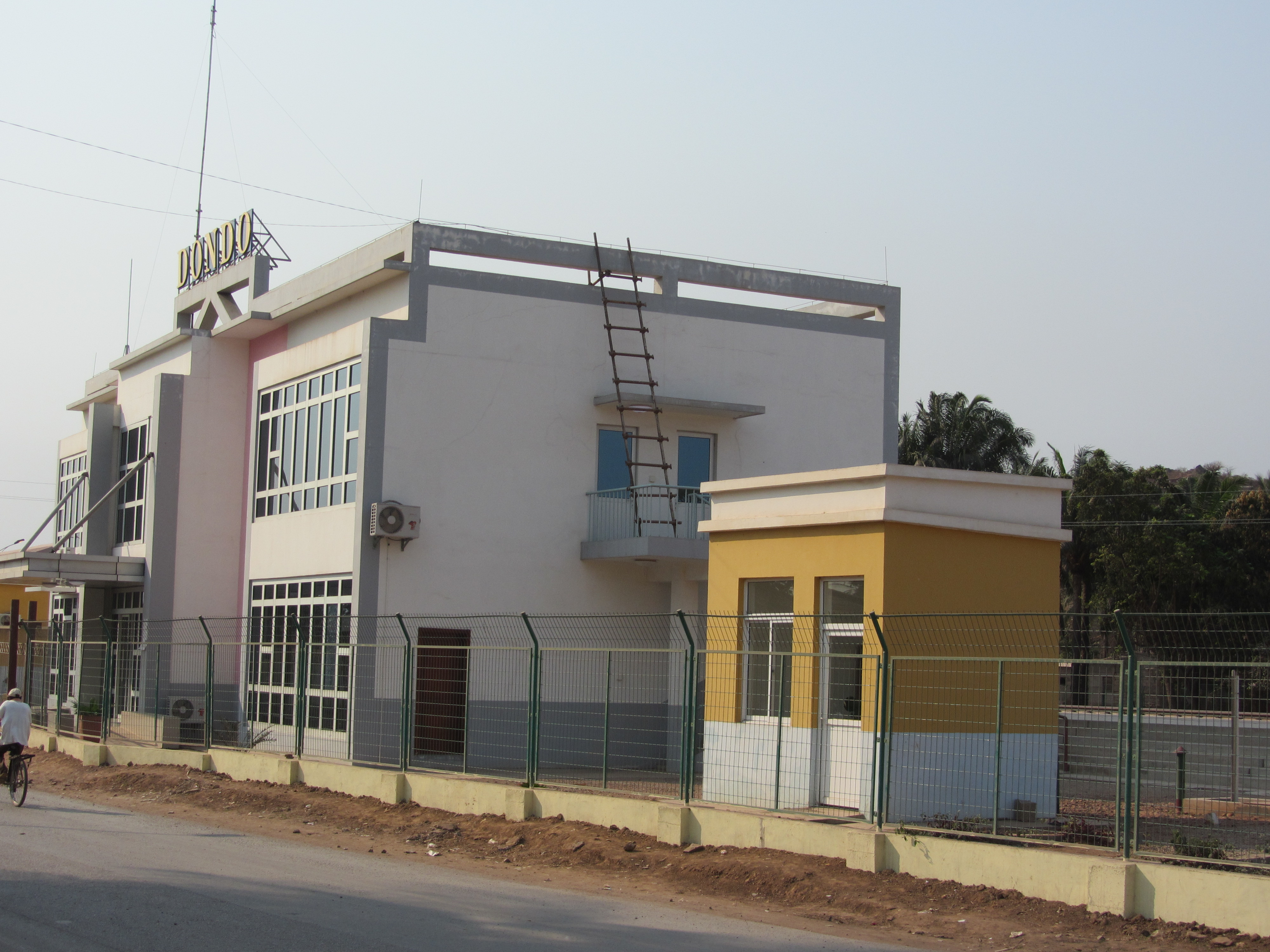
New Dondo railway station

Dondo is a town, with a population of 64,643 (2014), and a commune in the municipality of Cambambe, province of Cuanza Norte, Angola.

== Namesakes ==
There are several towns with this name. This is the one which is a branch terminus on the northern Luanda Railways. The namesakes are in Huila Province, Uíge Province and Huambo Province. There is also a town called Dondo in Mozambique.

== Map ==
- Travelingluck.com Map

== See also ==
- Railway stations in Angola
