= Quibaxe =

Commune in Angola

Quibaxe Kibaxe
- Commune and town
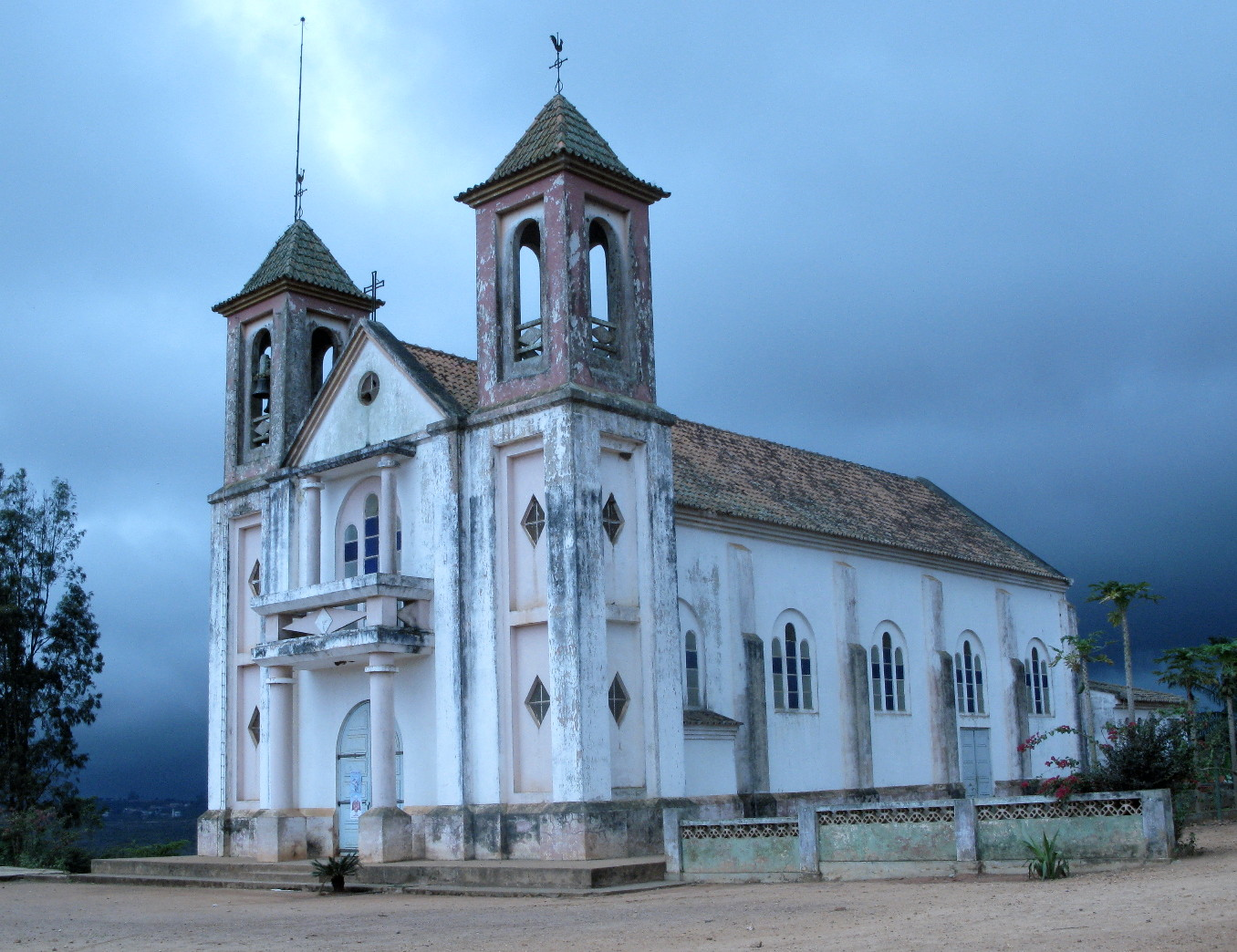
- Catholic of Dembos

- Location in Angola
- Country: Angola
- Province: Bengo
- Municipality: Dembos

Area
  - Commune and town: 199 sq mi (515 km^{2})

Population (Census 2014)
  - Commune and town: 18,176
  - Density: 91.4/sq mi (35.3/km^{2})
  - Urban: 8,268
- Time zone: UTC+1 (WAT)

Quibaxe is a town and commune in the municipality of Dembos, province of Bengo, Angola.
