= Nambuangongo =

- Municipality and town
- Location in Angola
- Coordinates: 8°1′S 14°12′E
- Country: Angola
- Province: Bengo Province

Population (2014 Census)
  - Total: 60,883
- Time zone: UTC+1 (WAT)

Nambuangongo is a municipality in the Bengo Province of Angola, with its seat in the city of Muxaluando.

== History ==
During the Angolan War of Independence, one of the most notable episodes of the conflict occurred in this municipality when, on March 15, 1961, guerrillas from the Union of the Peoples of Angola (UPA; later FNLA) attacked the farms in the region, killed numerous farmers, and caused the rest to flee. They then occupied the central commune of Nambuangongo and declared the locality as the capital of the "Free State of Angola," marking the first experience of a liberated Angolan territory with self-government post-World War II. The iconic capital, Nambuangongo, would later be recaptured by Portuguese troops, led by Lieutenant Colonel Armando Maçanita, in an operation that took place from July 4 to August 10 of the same year, known in history as Operation Viriato.

== Demographics ==
In 2014, it had 61,024 inhabitants. It is bordered to the north by the municipality of Ambuíla, to the east by the municipality of Quitexe, to the south by the municipality of Dembos, and to the west by the municipalities of Ambriz and Dande. It is composed of the communes of Cage, Canacassala, Gombe, Muxaluando, Quicunzo, Quixico, and Zala.

== See also ==
- List of municipalities of Angola
