= Ambriz =

- Municipality
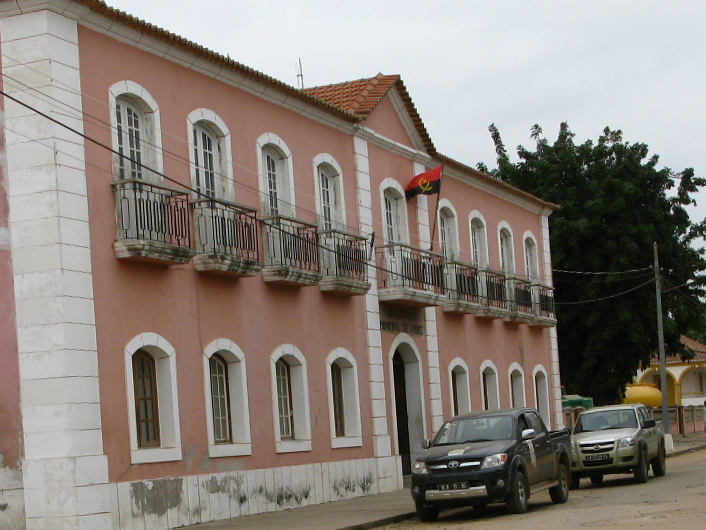
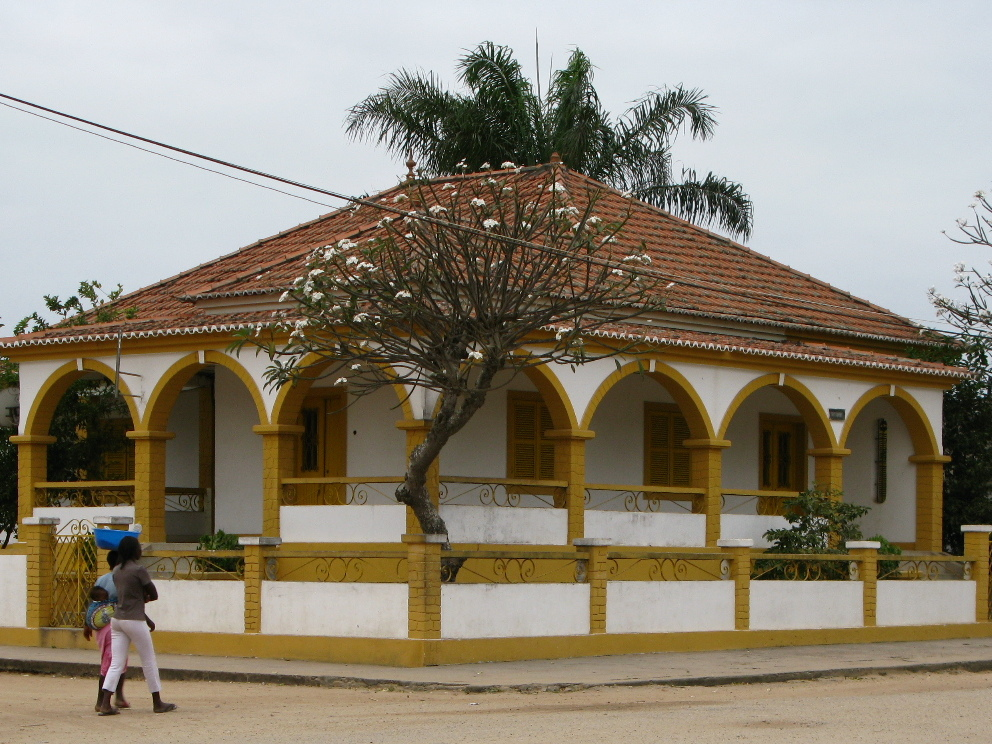

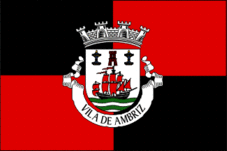
- Flag

- Location in Angola
- Coordinates: 7°51′S 13°07′E
- Country: Angola
- Admin. division: Bengo Province

Area
  - Total: 1,623.0 sq mi (4,203.5 km^{2})

Population (2024 Census)
  - Total: 54,309
- Time zone: UTC+1 (WAT)
- Climate: BSh
- Ambriz Lighthouse
- Constructed: ~1930s
- Foundation: masonry base
- Construction: masonry tower
- Height: 14 metres (46 ft)
- Shape: quadrangular tower with balcony and lantern
- Markings: white tower
- Operator: Instituto Marítimo e Portuário de Angola
- Focal height: 33 metres (108 ft)
- Range: 16 nautical miles (30 km; 18 mi)
- Characteristic: Fl (4) W 12s.
- Angola no.: PT-5180

Ambriz is a village and municipality in Bengo Province, Angola. It is located 127 km from the town of Caxito. It borders the municipality of N'zeto, Zaire Province, to the north and the municipality of Dande to the south.

== Demographics ==
The population of Ambriz totals 20,000, of whom the majority are Bakongo; there are also Portuguese descendants, and people of mixed Portuguese-African ancestry. The population includes people of the Ovimbundu and Kimbundu ethnic groups.

== Economy ==
Fishing is the traditional activity and low-scale agricultural activity. In the past, Ambriz had an oil and gas platform assembly yard (PETROMAR), which was destroyed during warfare in 1992. The base is being reconstructed. In 2007, an Angolan-Portuguese company announced plans to build a biodiesel plant to be fueled by palm oil.

== Transportation ==
The village has a small port and an airport with an unpaved runway.

== See also ==
- List of lighthouses in Angola
