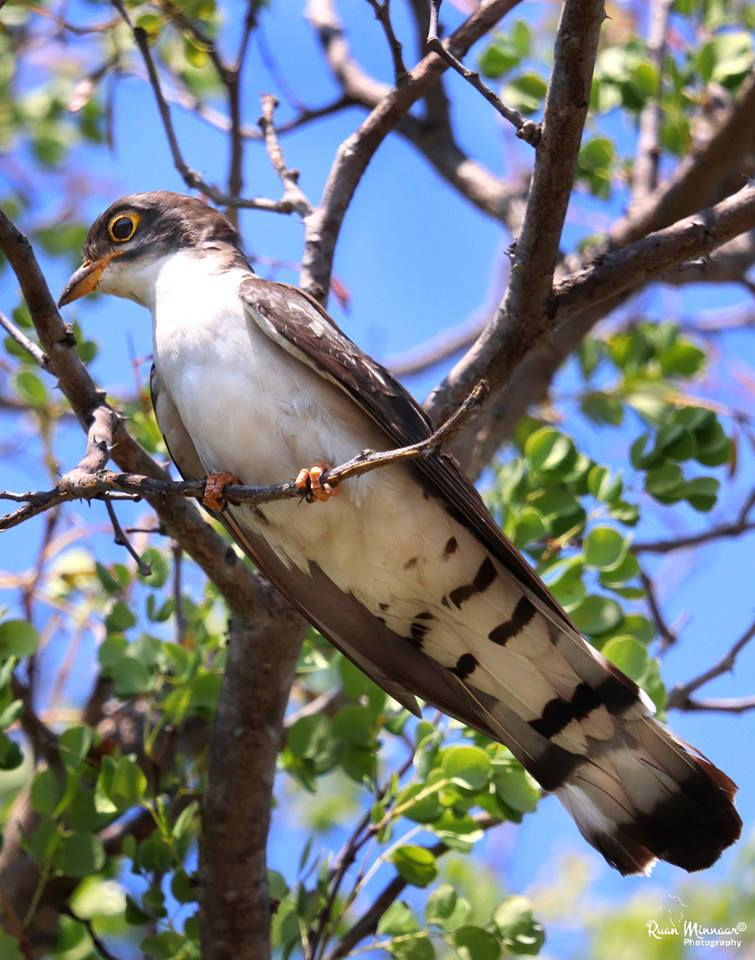

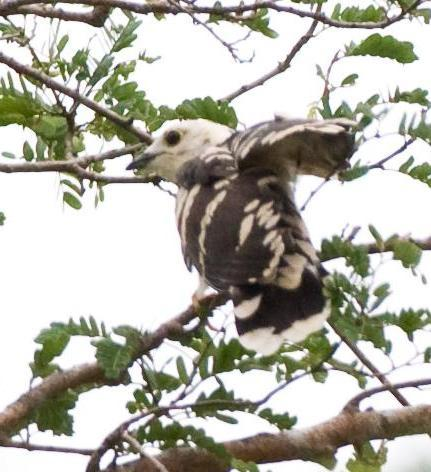
- An adult and juvenile bird in South Africa and Tanzania respectively

Conservation status
- Least Concern (IUCN 3.1)

Scientific classification
- Kingdom: Animalia
- Phylum: Chordata
- Class: Aves
- Order: Cuculiformes
- Family: Cuculidae
- Genus: Pachycoccyx; Cabanis, 1882
- Species: P. audeberti

Binomial name
- Pachycoccyx audeberti (Schlegel, 1879)

= Thick-billed cuckoo =

Species of bird

The thick-billed cuckoo (Pachycoccyx audeberti) is a species of cuckoo in the family Cuculidae. It is monotypic within the genus Pachycoccyx. It can easily be distinguished from other brood parasitic cuckoo species by its very thick bill, which is shaped in a rather hawk-like fashion.

== Taxonomy ==
In a molecular genetic study by Sorenson and Payne (2005), the thick-billed cuckoo appeared to be most closely related to the koels, consisting of the dwarf koel (Microdynamis parva) and the true koels (Eudynamys), although the evidence was not very strong and further research was required.

== Range and habitat ==
The thick-billed cuckoo is found in humid to subhumid woodlands and gallery forests from Guinea in the northwest to Mozambique in the southeast, though it is absent from large areas of the Congo Basin. It formerly occurred in the rainforests of northeastern Madagascar, but has not been reported from that island since 1922. In its southernmost regions the thick-billed cuckoo is partially migratory, spending the southern dry season in East Africa.

== Habits ==
It is a typical cuckoo in terms of behaviour, feeding on hairy caterpillars, but also having a strong preference for grasshoppers and praying mantises.

== Breeding ==
The thick-billed cuckoo is a specialised brood parasite of helmetshrikes, being known to almost exclusive parasitise three species in the red-billed and chestnut-fronted helmetshrike in its eastern range and the chestnut-bellied helmetshrike in West Africa, so limiting its breeding range to closed canopy forest habitat of the host in this region. In the case of the well-studied red-billed helmetshrike, the thick-billed cuckoo has caused probably the most dramatic reduction in nesting success by any brood parasitic bird, with one group of helmetshrikes unable to rear any of their own nestlings for five years and ten breeding attempts, with overall between 35 and 55 percent of nests parasitised. It is almost certain that the extinct Malagasy subspecies parasitised vangas, which are related to the helmetshrikes. This species' parasitism of the helmetshrikes may complement the similarly sized black cuckoo which exclusively parasitises bush shrikes.
