= Cambambe Hydroelectric Power Station =

Hydroelectric power station in Angola

Cambambe Power Station
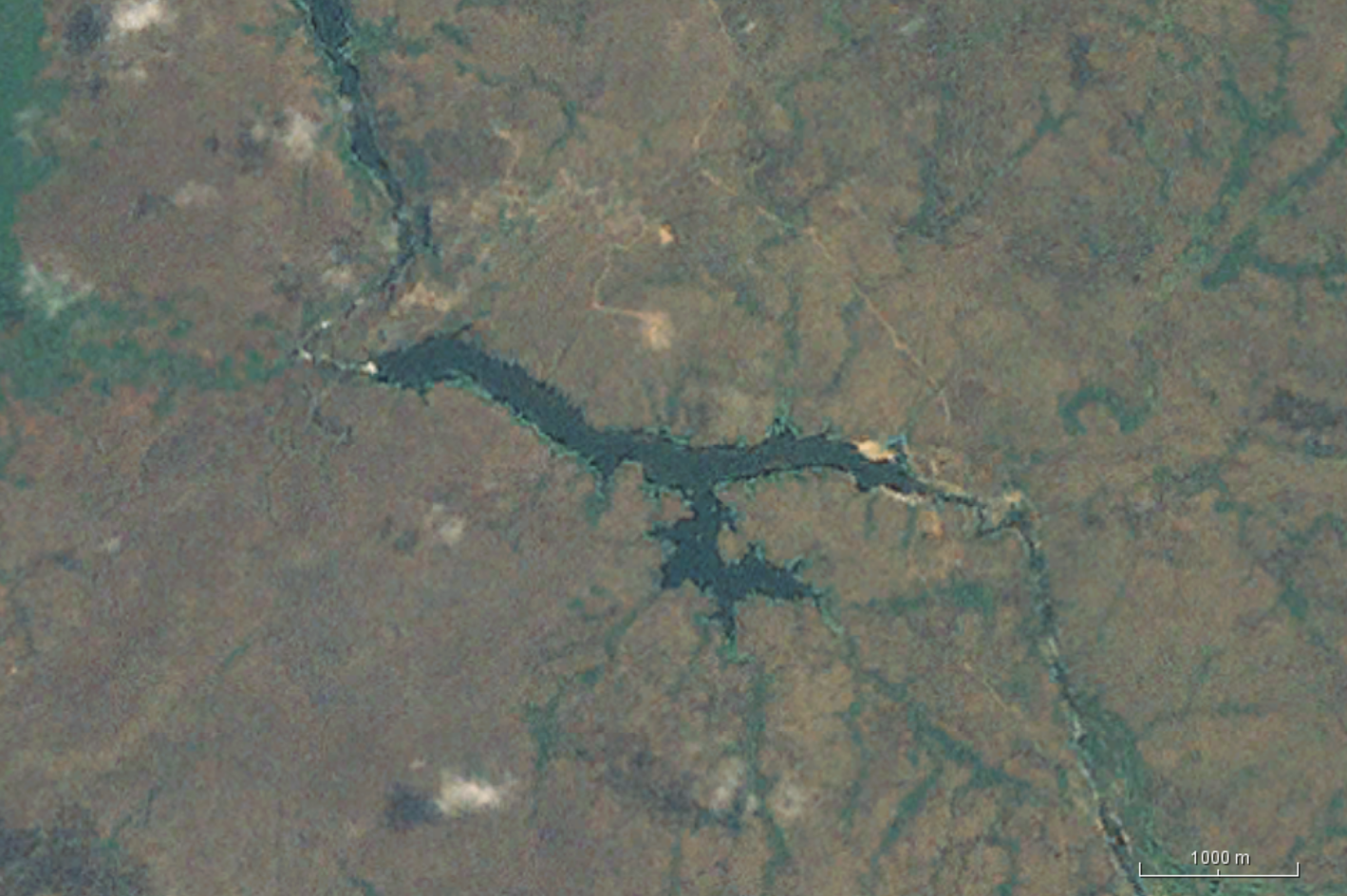

- Location within Angola
- Country: Angola
- Location: Cuanza Norte Province
- Coordinates: 09°45′12″S 14°28′51″E
- Status: Under construction
- Construction began: 7 October 1959
- Opening date: 6 October 1963

Dam and spillways
- Type of dam: Arch dam
- Impounds: Kwanza River
- Height (thalweg): 132 m (433 ft)
- Length: 300 m (980 ft)
- Spillways: 7
- Spillway capacity: 4,500 m^{3}/s (160,000 cu ft/s)

Reservoir
- Surface area: 5.5 km^{2} (2.1 sq mi)

Power Station
- Turbines: Cambambe 1: 4 x 65 MW, Francis-type; Cambambe 2: 4 x 175 MW Francis-type
- Installed capacity: Cambambe 1: 260 MW; Cambambe 2: 700 MW; Total: 960 MW
- Website ahcambambe.com

The Cambambe Hydroelectric Power Station is a hydroelectric power plant across the Kwanza River at the border between Cuanza Norte Province and Bengo Province in Angola. Following rehabilitation and expansion, this installation's generation capacity is 960 megawatts (1,290,000 hp).

== Location ==
The power station is located across the Kwanza River in Cambambe, Angola, about 198 kilometres (123 mi) by road southeast of Luanda, the capital and largest city in the country. The geographical coordinates of the power station are:09°45'12.0"S, 14°28'51.0"E (Latitude:-9.753333; Longitude:14.480833).

== Overview ==
Construction of the Cambambe 1 Dam began on October 7, 1959, and was completed in 1963. Due to wear and tear and lack of maintenance, by 2002, output had fallen from 180 megawatts to approximately 80 megawatts.

In April 2007, a consortium comprising Odebrecht, Voith, Alstom, and Engevix was hired by the Empresa Nacional de Electricidade to carry out the project of rehabilitation, expansion, and modernization of the dam and power station. The project includes the heightening of the structure by 30 meters, the modernization of the generating units of the Cambambe 1, replacing the four 45 MW turbines with four 65 MW turbines, and the construction of a new plant, called Cambambe 2, with four generating units of 175 MW each, for a total of 700 MW. The works in Cambambe 1 started in March 2009, and in Cambambe 2 in 2013.

== Construction ==
In July 2015, it was anticipated that the first 175-megawatt turbine of Cambambe II would be installed and come online in June 2016, with completion expected in 2017.

Other upgrades included the construction of three new energy transformation substations with capacities of 400KV, 220KV, and 60KV to support the connection between Cambambe 1 and 2, Capanda Hydroelectric Power Station, and Laúca Hydroelectric Power Station. The renovation and upgrade of Cambambe 1 and the construction of Cambambe 2 cost an estimated US$2 billion.

The completed power station was commissioned on 27 July 2017, in front of 500 invited guests.

== See also ==
- List of power stations in Angola
