= Angolan Scarp savanna and woodlands =

Ecoregion in Angola

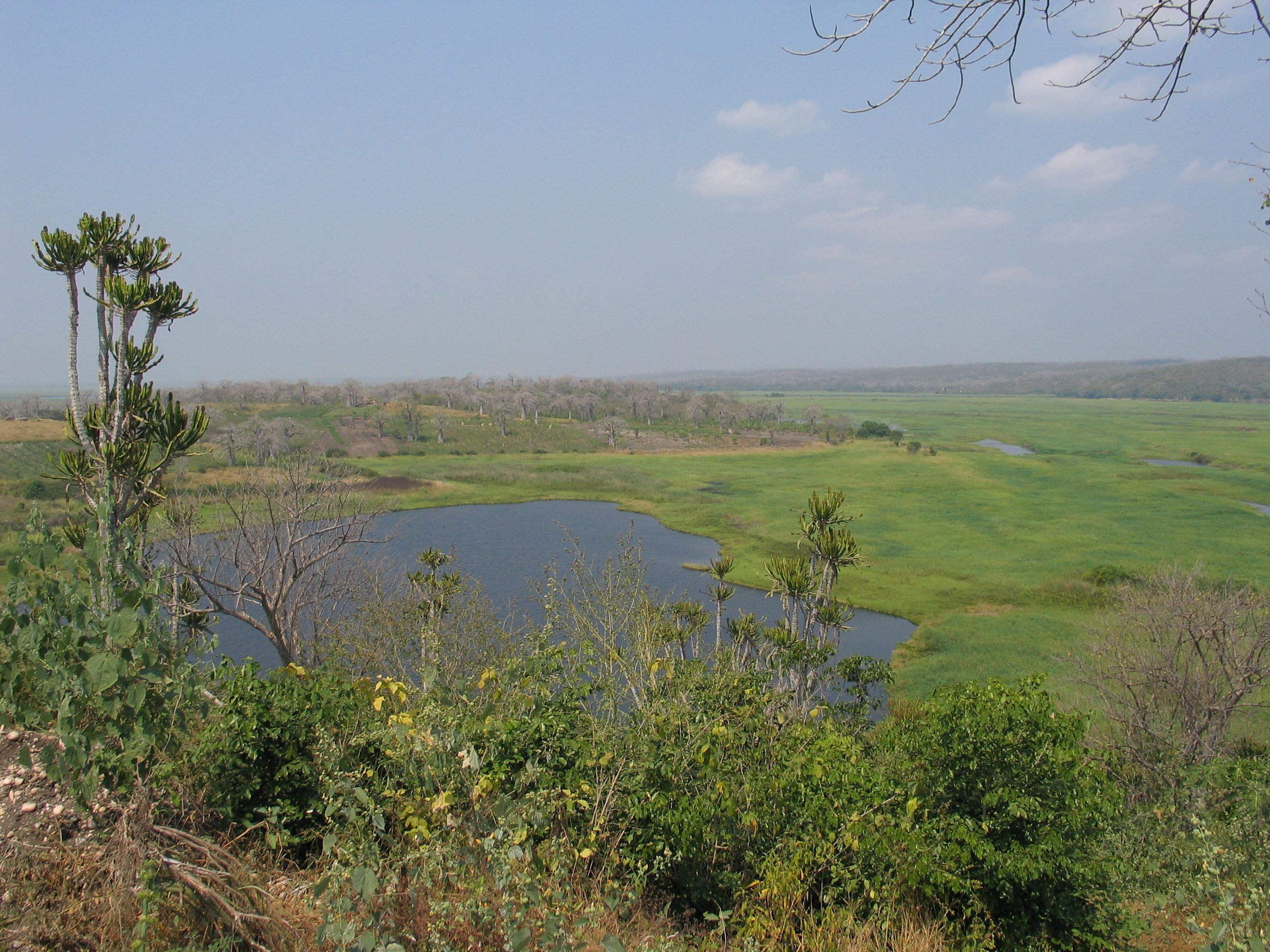
- Bengo Province, Angola

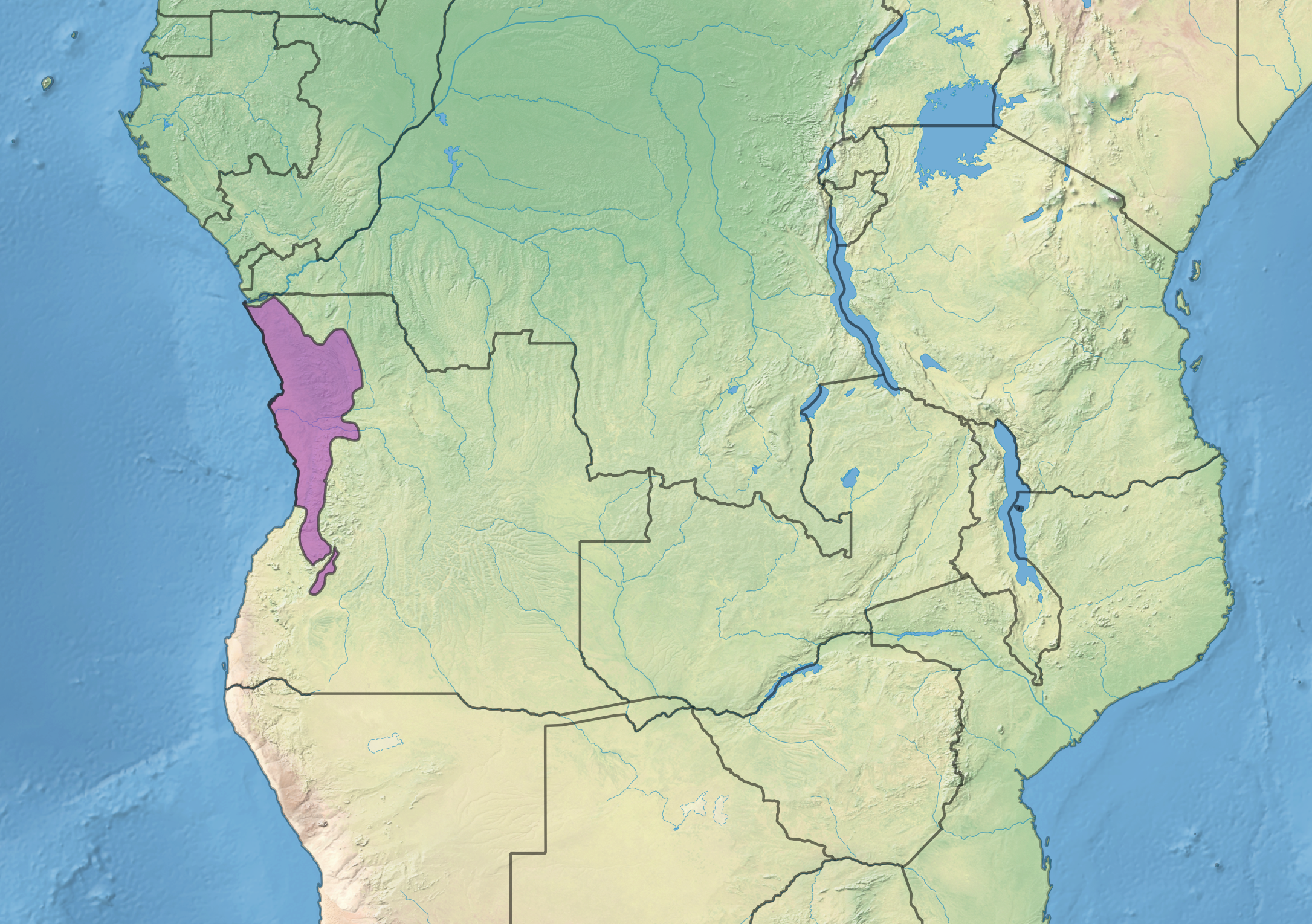
- Map of the Angolan Scarp savanna and woodlands

Ecology
- Realm: Afrotropical
- Biome: montane grasslands and shrublands
- Borders: Angolan miombo woodlands; Angolan montane forest–grassland mosaic; Central African mangroves; Western Congolian forest–savanna mosaic

Geography
- Area: 74,300 km^{2} (28,700 mi^{2})
- Countries: Angola

Conservation
- Conservation status: Vulnerable
- Protected: 11.61%

The Angolan Scarp savanna and woodlands is an ecoregion located on the coast of Angola, an area with a variety of habitats and rich in wildlife including many endemic birds and animals.

== Geography ==
This ecoregion consists of the strip of land that runs along the coast of Angola and the steep west-facing ridge that rises from the Atlantic coast to Angola's large central plateau, to a height of about 1000m.

The ecoregion contains Angola's capital Luanda, a city that has grown to more than 3.5 million people.

== Climate ==
This coast has a tropical climate with summer rains and high humidity all year round.

== Flora ==
The area contains a mixture of types of habitat: rain forest, cloud forest, grassland, mangroves, and swamp.

This diverse ecoregion can be divided into three different areas according to their type of habitat. North of the Cuanza River is a forest of tall trees surrounded by tall grasses, with areas of mangrove and swamp on riverbanks especially in the river estuaries.

At higher elevations on the western ridge between Dondo and Quilengues are patches of cloud forest, which shelter a rich variety of endemic plants and animals. These patches range in area from a few to several thousand hectares. Amboim Forest is the largest, with other forests at Gabela, Vila Nova do Seles, Dondo, Mumbondo, Asango, and Conda. The upper forests are humid, with trees reaching up to 40 meters in height, and they grade into drier forests at lower elevations. Typical canopy trees include Bombax buonopozense subsp. reflexum, Khaya anthotheca, Blighia unijugata, Zanha golungensis, Piptadeniastrum africanum, Celtis mildbraedii, and Spathodea campanulata. Epiphytes grow abundantly on the trees.

Finally, on the coastal strip and the low slopes of the escarpment south of the Cuanza there are dry woodlands and wooded grasslands. (See Central African mangroves for a description of the coastal swamps).

== Fauna ==
The forests have been home to a variety of mammals including the African forest elephant, lion and cheetah, but uncontrolled hunting may have completely removed these. Remaining mammals include the yellow-backed duiker (Cephalophus sylvicultor), black-fronted duiker (Cephalophus nigrifrons), blue duiker (Cephalophus monticola), and smaller species such as the tree pangolin (Phataginus tricuspis), Beecroft's flying squirrel and forest giant squirrel. In the dry season animals migrate to the moister areas uphill. Larger mammals, which are found especially in the drier grasslands rather than the forests on the ridge, include roan antelope (Hippotragus equinus), African forest buffalo (Syncerus caffer nanus), African bush elephant (Loxodonta africana), southern reedbuck (Redunca arundinum), bushbuck (Tragelaphus scriptus) and eland (Taurotragus oryx).

Bird species endemic to this coast include the grey-striped spurfowl (Pternistis griseostriatus), red-crested turaco (Tauraco erythrolophus), Gabela helmet-shrike (Prionops gabela), white-fronted wattle-eye (Platysteira albifrons), Angola slaty flycatcher (Dioptrornis brunneus), Gabela akalat (Sheppardia gabela), Angola cave-chat (Xenocopsychus ansorgei), Pulitzer's longbill (Macrosphenus pulitzeri), golden-backed bishop (Euplectes aureus), orange-breasted bush-shrike (Laniarius brauni), Gabela bush-shrike (Laniarius amboimensis), and (found here and in Cameroon) Monteiro's bush-shrike (Malaconotus monteiri). Birds with endemic sub-species include brown-chested alethe (Alethe poliocephala hallae), yellow-necked greenbul (Chlorocichla falkensteini falkensteini), and grey-backed camaroptera (Camaroptera brevicaudata harterti).

The coastal strip is home to two endemic reptiles; a gecko (Hemidactylus bayonii) and a worm lizard Monopeltis luandae, and four endemic frogs; Hyperolius punctulatus, Congulu forest treefrog (Leptopelis jordani), Quissange forest treefrog (Leptopelis marginatus), and Congolo frog (Amnirana parkeriana).

== Threats and preservation ==
This is a populous part of Angola and farming, logging and uncontrolled hunting are all affecting the forest habitats and the large mammals in particular are now rare. Until the 1970s the cloud forest area on the escarpment was used for planting coffee, which meant clearing the undergrowth, but coffee growing ceased during the Angolan Civil War and the undergrowth has renewed itself. The dry area to the south of the region has not been settled and much grassland remains. Some larger mammals have been protected in Quiçama National Park (Kissama), which is on the coast near the Cuanza River, but in general this area has been badly affected by the civil war and is poorly studied or protected.

== Protected areas ==
11.61% of the ecoregion is in protected areas. The protected areas are Quiçãma National Park, Ilheu dos Passaros Integral Nature Reserve, and Buffalo Partial Reserve.
