= List of power stations in Angola =

This article lists the power stations in Angola.

== Legend ==
Facilities under construction
Planned facilities
Decommissioned facilities (year)

== Natural gas ==
List of all natural gas power plants in Angola.

Station	Location	Capacity (MW)	Commissioned	Ref
Luanda OCGT Power Plant	Luanda -8.8148, 13.3077	148	1979	

== Hydroelectric ==
List of all hydroelectric power plants in Angola.

Station	Location	Capacity (MW)	Commissioned	River	Ref
Laúca Hydroelectric Power Station	09°44′34″S 15°07′32″E	2070	2020	Kwanza River	
Cambambe Hydroelectric Power Station	09°45′08″S 14°28′52″E	960	Dam #1: 1963; Dam #2: 2017	Kwanza River	
Capanda Dam	09°47′41″S 15°27′59″E	520	2004	Kwanza River	
Matala Hydroelectric Power Station	14°44′38″S 15°02′31″E	40	1954	Cunene River	
Caculo Cabaça Hydroelectric Power Station	09°46′50″S 14°32′58″E	2,172	2024	Kwanza River	
Baynes Hydroelectric Power Station	17°11′17″S 12°39′02″E	600	2029	Cunene River	

== Solar ==
Solar power station	Community	Coordinates	Fuel type	Capacity (megawatts)	Year completed	Name of owner	Notes
Quilemba Solar Power Station	Lubango, Huila Province	14°52′39″S 13°37′38″E	Solar	35	2023 (expected)	Total Eren and Greentech	
Biopio Solar Power Station	Biopio, Catumbela, Benguela Province	12°28′06″S 13°44′37″E	Solar	188.8	20 July 2022	Ministry of Energy and Water, Angola	
Caraculo Solar Power Station	Caraculo, Namibe Province	15°01′02″S 12°39′30″E	Solar	25 expandable to 50	31 May 2023 (Phase 1)	Solenova Limited	
Baía Farta Solar Power Station	Baía Farta, Benguela Province	12°37′18″S 13°10′51″E	Solar	96.7	20 July 2022	Ministry of Energy and Water, Angola	
Luena Solar Power Station	Luena, Moxico Province	11°47′52″S 19°59′26″E	Solar	26.91	2024 (expected)	Ministry of Energy and Water, Angola	

== See also ==
- List of power stations in Africa
- List of largest power stations in the world
