= Cutato =

Cutato or Kutato may refer to the Cutato River, or the following places on that river:

- the commune of Cutato, Bié, Angola
- the municipality of Cutato, Cubango, Angola; or the commune in that municipality also called Cutato
