= Caculo Cabaça Hydroelectric Power Station =

Hydropower station in Angola

- Map of Angola showing the location of Caculo Cabaça Power Station.
- Country: Angola
- Location: São Pedro da Quilemba, Cuanza Norte Province
- Coordinates: 09°41′11″S 14°59′20″E
- Purpose: Power
- Status: Under construction
- Construction began: 2017
- Opening date: 2026 (expected)
- Construction cost: US$5.2 billion
- Owner: Government of Angola
- Operators: Gezhouba Group & Empresa Pública de Produção de Electricidade

Dam and spillways
- Type of dam: RCC Gravity dam
- Impounds: Kwanza River

Power Station
- Turbines: 4 x 530 MW + 1 x 52 MW
- Installed capacity: 2,172 MW

Caculo Cabaça Hydroelectric Power Station is a 2,172 MW hydroelectric power station under construction in Angola. When completed, it will be bigger than the 2,070 MW Laúca Hydroelectric Power Station, the largest power station in the country, as of July 2017.

== Location ==
The power station is located at the village of São Pedro da Quilemba, near the city of Dondo, in Cuanza Norte Province. This location is approximately 195 kilometres (121 mi), by road, southeast of Luanda, the capital and largest city of Angola. The geographical coordinates of Caculo Cabaça Hydroelectric Power Station are: 09°46'50.0"S, 14°32'58.0"E (Latitude:-9.780556; Longitude:14.549444).

== Overview ==
In August 2017, construction began on this power station, by the selected contractor, China Gezhouba Group Company Limited, with partial funding from the state-owned Industrial and Commercial Bank of China (ICBC). The planned generation capacity at Caculo Cabaça is 2,172 megawatts, to be used in Angola and for export to the countries in the Southern African Power Pool.

Construction is expected to last at least 80 months. In October 2019, the Angola Press News Agency reported that commercial commissioning of this power station was expected in 2024.

The main dam will be 103 metres (338 ft) in height, with crest width of 553 metres (1,814 ft), creating a reservoir lake that measures 16.3 kilometres (10 mi) in length, with a surface area of 16.6 square kilometres (6 sq mi).

== Construction costs and funding ==
The total project cost is budgeted at US $4.5 billion, 85 percent of which was borrowed from ICBC. The construction company, Gezhouba Group, will own, operate and maintain the power station for at least four years after commercial commissioning. During those four years, China Gezhouba will train Angolan engineers and technicians on how to manage the power station. An estimated 10,000 workers are expected to be hired during the construction phase.

In May 2023 the construction budget was revised upwards to US$5.2 billion, with US$3.8 billion allocated to the dam and US$1.4 billion allocated to electric generation and transmission equipment. The government of Germany has agreed to lend $1.16 billion to the government of Angola to fund the procurement and installation of the turbines and related electrical hardware by the German conglomerate Voith Hydro.

In January 2024, Voith Hydro was contracted to supply four Francis turbines with an output of 530MW each and one additional Francis turbine with an output of 52MW, together with related hardware. When the power station is commercially commissioned, 67 percent of Angolan national generation capacity will be derived from hydropower sources. The source of the European funding was identified as Commerzbank and UniCredit, with government-to-government guarantees provided by the Federal Republic of Germany. The supply order to Voith exceeds US$1 billion.

Completion of construction is expected in October 2026.

== See also ==
- List of power stations in Angola
