= Biopio Solar Power Station =

Solar power station in Angola

- Country: Angola
- Location: Biópio, Catumbela, Benguela Province
- Coordinates: 12°28′06″S 13°44′37″E
- Status: Operational
- Construction began: March 2021
- Commission date: 20 July 2022
- Construction cost: US$426.87 million
- Owners: Ministry of Energy and Water, Angola
- Operators: Ministry of Energy and Water, Angola

Solar farm
- Type: Flat-panel PV

Power generation
- Nameplate capacity: 188.8 MW (253,200 hp)

The Biopio Solar Power Station is an operational 189 MW (253,000 hp) solar power plant in Angola. The power station, which reached commercial commissioning on 20 October 2022, was developed by a consortium comprising (a) M.Couto Alves SA, a construction company based in Portugal (b) M. Couto Alves Vias SA, an energy consulting company based in Angola and (c) Sun Africa LLC, a renewable energy solutions company based in the United States. The power station is owned by the Angolan Ministry of Energy and Water. The power off-taker is Empresa Rede Nacional de Transporte de Electricidade (RNT-EP) (English: National Electricity Transmission Network).

== Location ==
The power station is located in Biópio, in the municipality of Catumbela, in Benguela Province. Biopio is located approximately 52.6 kilometres (32.7 mi), southeast of downtown Catumbela.

== Overview ==
The power station is a ground-mounted solar photovoltaic panel design. The solar farm occupies 436 hectares (1.68 sq mi), on which 509,040 solar panels were installed. The design calls for a generation capacity of 188.8 megawatts. Its output is sold directly to the Empresa Rede Nacional de Transporte de Electricidade (RNT), the national electricity transportation utility company, for integration into the national grid, under a long-term power purchase agreement.

The Angolan government is in the process of expanding national electricity generation from 5.01 GW in 2021 to 9.9 GW by 2025, of which 800 MW is sourced from renewable sources.

== Developers and ownership ==
The table below illustrates the corporate entities who developed the solar farm and their countries of domicile.

Biopio Solar Company Developers
Rank	Name of Developer	Domicile	Specialty	Notes
1	M. Couto Alves SA	Portugal	Construction	
2	M. Couto Alves Vias SA	Angola	Consultant	
2	Sun Africa	United States	Consultant, Finance & Management	

As of April 2023, the power station is reported to belong to the Angolan Ministry of Energy and Water.

== Construction and funding ==
The construction costs of this renewable energy infrastructure is reported as US$426.87 million. The project received funding from (1) the Swedish Export Credit Corporation, South Korea Trade Insurance Corporation (K-Sure), and the Development Bank of Southern Africa.

== See also ==
- List of power stations in Angola
- Empresa Nacional de Electricidade de Angola
