= Caraculo Solar Power Station =

Solar power station in Angola

- Country: Angola
- Location: Caraculo, Namibe Province
- Coordinates: 15°01′02″S 12°39′30″E
- Status: Operational
- Construction began: 2022
- Commission date: 31 May 2023 (Phase 1)
- Owner: Solenova Limited
- Operator: Solenova Limited

Solar farm
- Type: Flat-panel PV

Power generation
- Nameplate capacity: 25 MW (34,000 hp) expandable to 50 MW (67,000 hp)

The Caraculo Solar Power Station is a planned 50 MW (67,000 hp) solar power plant in Angola. The power station is owned and operated by a consortium comprising Eni, the Italian energy multinational, in collaboration with Sonangol, the Angolan energy parastatal. On 31 May 2023, 25 MW of power came online, in the first phase with another 25 megawatts to follow.

== Location ==
The power station is located near the small town of Caraculo, in Namibe Province, in southwestern Angola. Caraculo is located approximately 66 kilometres (41 mi), by road, northeast of Namibe, the provincial capital. This is approximately 942 kilometres (585 mi), by road, south of Luanda, the national capital.

== Overview ==
The power station, which will be constructed in phases, is designed to have generation capacity of 50 megawatts, when fully constituted. The first phase with generation output of 25 megawatts, was built first, then followed by the second stage of equal capacity. Its output is intended to be sold directly to the Empresa Rede Nacional de Transporte de Electricidade (RNT), the national electricity transportation utility company, for integration into the national grid, under a long-term power purchase agreement, which was yet to be signed, as of December 2021.

In December 2021, a final investment decision (FID), was signed between Eni and Sonangol specifying 50/50 ownership in the project. The two shareholders formed a special purpose vehicle company, named Solenova Limited, which will own, design, finance, build, operate and maintain the solar farm. The undisclosed engineering, procurement and construction (EPC) contractor has been selected. Construction is expected to begin in the fourth quarter of calendar year 2022.

== Developers ==
The table below illustrates the corporate entities who own a stake in the special purpose vehicle (SPV) company Solenova Limited:

Solenova Limited Company Stock Ownership
Rank	Name of Owner	Domicile	Ownership (%)	Notes
1	Eni	Italy	50.0	
2	Sonangol Group	Angola	50.0	

== Benefits ==
The energy generated by this power station is expected to reduce the country's electricity deficit and to increase the proportion of the Angolan population who are connected to grid electricity. This renewable energy project is in line with the country's desire to attain 800 megawatts of "installed renewable capacity by 2025".

== See also ==
- List of power stations in Angola
- Quilemba Solar Power Station
