= Baía Farta Solar Power Station =

Solar power station in Angola

- Country: Angola
- Location: Baía Farta, Benguela Province
- Coordinates: 12°37′18″S 13°10′51″E
- Status: Operational
- Construction began: March 2021
- Commission date: 20 July 2022
- Construction cost: US$152 million
- Owners: Ministry of Energy and Water, Angola
- Operator: Empresa Pública de Produção de Electricidade (PRODEL-EP)

Solar farm
- Type: Flat-panel PV

Power generation
- Nameplate capacity: 96.7 MW (129,700 hp)

The Baía Farta Solar Power Station is an operational 96.7 MW (129,700 hp) solar power plant in Angola. The power station, which was commercially commissioned on 20 July 2022, was developed by a consortium comprising (a) M. Couto Alves Vias SA, an energy consulting company based in Angola (b) M.Couto Alves SA, a construction company based in Portugal and (c) Sun Africa LLC, a renewable energy solutions company based in the United States. The power off-taker is Empresa Rede Nacional de Transporte de Electricidade (RNT-EP) (English: National Electricity Transmission Network). The power station is owned by the Angolan Ministry of Energy and Water.

== Location ==
The power station is located at Baía Farta, a municipality in Benguela Province. Baía Farta sits on the coast of Atlantic Ocean, approximately 29 kilometres (18 mi), southwest of city of Benguela, the provincial capital. The geographical coordinates of the power station are: 12°37'18.0"S, 13°10'51.0"E (Latitude:-12.621667; Longitude:13.180833).

== Overview ==
The power station comprises 261,360 ground-mounted solar photovoltaic panels. The solar complex sits on a piece of real estate measuring 186 hectares (460 acres). The design calls for a generation capacity of 96.7 megawatts. Its output is sold directly to the Empresa Rede Nacional de Transporte de Electricidade (RNT), the national electricity transportation utility company, for integration into the national grid.

The Angolan government is in the process of expanding national electricity generation from 5.01 GW in 2021 to 9.9 GW by 2025, of which 800 MW is sourced from renewable sources.

== Developers and ownership ==
The table below illustrates the corporate entities who developed the solar farm and their countries of domicile.

Baía Farta Solar Company Developers
Rank	Name of Developer	Domicile	Specialty	Notes
1	M. Couto Alves SA (MCA SA)	Portugal	Construction	
2	M. Couto Alves Vias SA (MCA Vias SA)	Angola	Consultant	
2	Sun Africa	United States	Consultant, Finance & Management	

The power station is reported to belong to the Angolan Ministry of Energy and Water and is operated by Empresa Pública de Produção de Electricidade (PRODEL-EP), the national electricity generation utility company.

== Construction costs ==
The construction costs of this renewable energy infrastructure is reported as US$152 million.

== See also ==
- List of power stations in Angola
- Empresa Nacional de Electricidade de Angola
