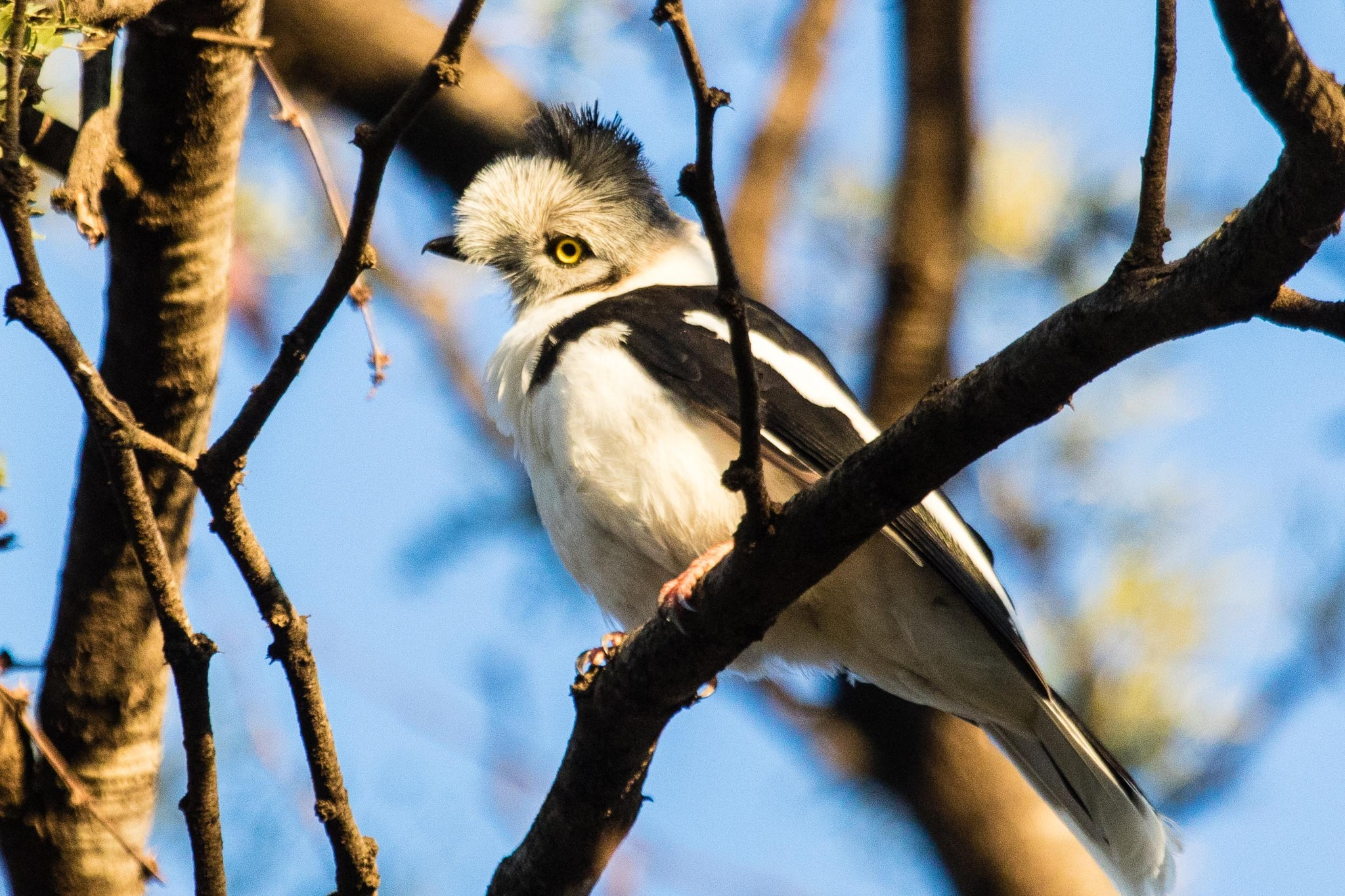
- In Tanzania

Conservation status
- Least Concern (IUCN 3.1)

Scientific classification
- Kingdom: Animalia
- Phylum: Chordata
- Class: Aves
- Order: Passeriformes
- Family: Vangidae
- Genus: Prionops
- Species: P. poliolophus

Binomial name
- Prionops poliolophus Fischer & Reichenow, 1884

= Grey-crested helmetshrike =

Species of bird

The gray-crested helmetshrike (Prionops poliolophus) is a species of bird in the Vanga family Vangidae, formerly usually included in the Malaconotidae.

It is found in Kenya and Tanzania. Its natural habitats are dry savanna and subtropical or tropical dry shrubland. It is threatened by habitat loss.

It has a clutch size of one egg.

== Gallery ==
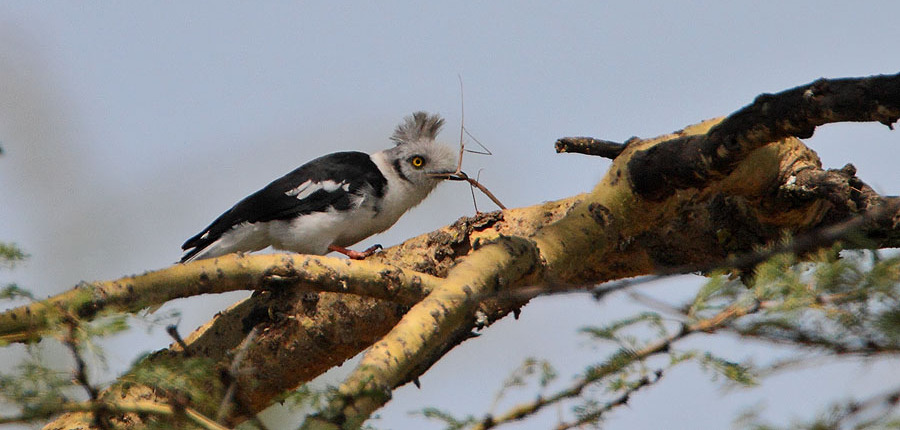
At Lake Nakuru National Park, Kenya

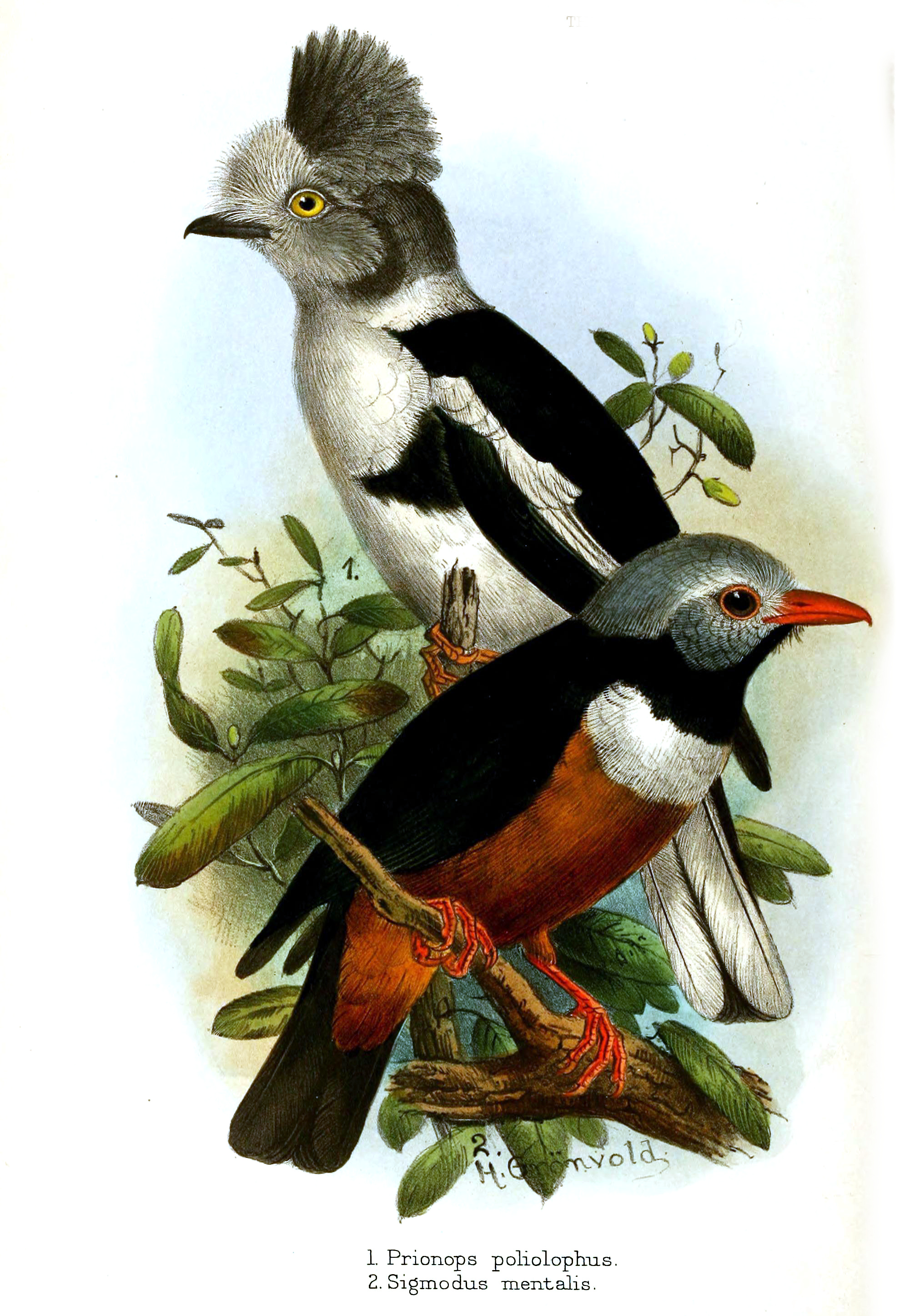
Illustration with Prionops rufiventris
