= Quilemba Solar Power Station =

Solar power station in Angola

- Country: Angola
- Location: Quilemba, Lubango Commune, Huila Province
- Coordinates: 14°47′42″S 13°28′16″E
- Status: Proposed
- Commission date: 2023 (Expected)
- Construction cost: US$79.13 million
- Owner: Quilemba Solar Company
- Operator: Quilemba Solar Company

Solar farm
- Type: Flat-panel PV

Power generation
- Nameplate capacity: 35 MW (47,000 hp)

The Quilemba Solar Power Station is a planned 35 MW (47,000 hp) solar power plant in Angola. The power station is in the development stage, by a consortium comprising Total Eren, a subsidiary of TotalEnergies, the French oil conglomerate, in collaboration with Greentech-Angola Environment Technology and Sonangol, the Angolan energy parastatal.

== Location ==
The power station is located in the city of Lubango, the capital of Angola's Huila Province, in southwest Angola, approximately 900 kilometres (559 mi), by road, south of Luanda, the country's capital.

== Overview ==
The power station is designed to have generation capacity of 35 megawatts. Its output is intended to be sold directly to the Empresa Rede Nacional de Transporte de Electricidade (RNT), the national electricity transportation utility company, for integration into the national grid, under a long-term power purchase agreement. On 30 November 2020, a memorandum of understanding (MOU) was signed by the developers of this power station and the government of Angola for the design, financing, construction and operation of Quilemba Solar Power Station, with generation capacity of 35 megawatts.

The Angolan government is in the process of expanding national electricity generation from the current (2021) 5.01 GW to 9.9 GW by 2025, of which 800 MW is sourced from renewable sources.

== Developers ==
The table below illustrates the corporate entities who own a stake in the special purpose vehicle (SPV) company "Quilemba Solar Company":

Quilemba Solar Company Stock Ownership
| Rank | Name of Owner | Domicile | Ownership (%) | Notes |
|---|---|---|---|---|
| 1 | Total Eren | France | 51.0 | |
| 2 | Sonangol Group | Angola | 30.0 | |
| 2 | Greentech-Angola Environment Technology | Angola | 19.0 | |

As of April 2021, discussions are ongoing, seeking the participation of Sonangol, the national oil company of Angola, in the development consortium. In October 2021, Sonangol agreed to take a 30 percent shareholding in Quilemba Solar Company, the SPV company.

== Benefits ==
The energy generated by this power station is expected to reduce the country's electricity deficit and to increase the proportion of the Angolan population who are connected to grid electricity.

== See also ==
- List of power stations in Angola
- Caraculo Solar Power Station
- Luena Solar Power Station
