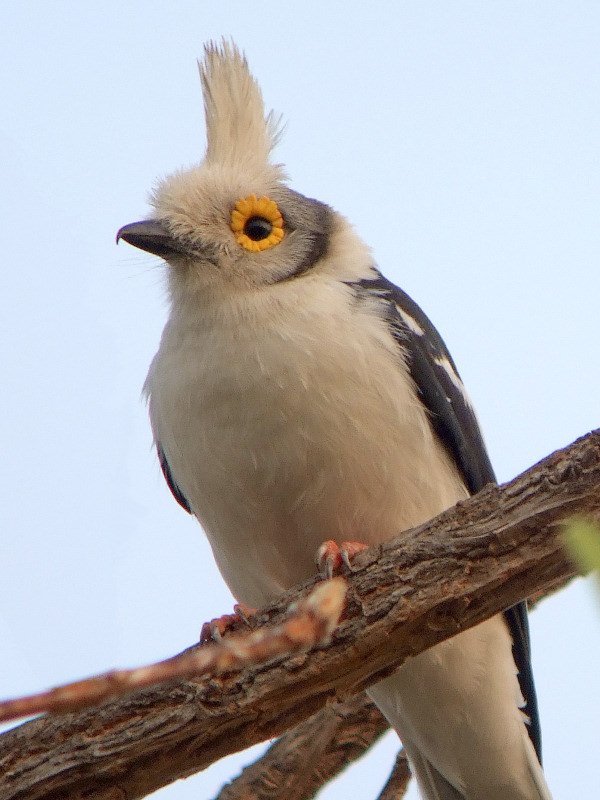
- White-crested helmetshrike Prionops plumatus

Scientific classification
- Kingdom: Animalia
- Phylum: Chordata
- Class: Aves
- Order: Passeriformes
- Family: Vangidae
- Genus: Prionops; Vieillot, 1816

Type species
- Lanius plumatus Shaw, 1809

= Helmetshrike =

Helmetshrikes

Genus of birds

Helmetshrikes are the eight species of smallish to mid-sized African passerine birds in the genus Prionops. They were previously included with the true shrikes in the family Laniidae, later on split between several presumably closely related groups such as bushshrikes (Malaconotidae) and cuckooshrikes (Campephagidae), but are now considered sufficiently distinctive to be separated from that group into the family Vangidae.

== Taxonomy ==
The genus Prionops was introduced in 1816 by the French ornithologist Louis Vieillot to accommodate a single species, "Le Geoffroy", that had been described in 1799 by the French naturalist François Levaillant based on specimens collected in Senegal. Levaillant did not coin a Latin name for "Le Geoffroy" but in 1809 George Shaw introduced the binomial name Lanius plumatus for Levaillant's bird. This species, the white-crested helmetshrike, is the type species of the genus Prionops. The genus name combines the Ancient Greek πριων/priōn, πριονος/prionos meaning "a saw" with ωψ/ōps, ωπος/ōpos meaning "eye".

The genus contains eight species:

Image	Common name	Scientific name	Distribution
	White-crested helmetshrike	Prionops plumatus	Widely distributed in deciduous broadleaf savanna woodlands across sub-Saharan Africa.
	Grey-crested helmetshrike	Prionops poliolophus	Dry thornscrub of southwestern Kenya and western Tanzania.
	Yellow-crested helmetshrike	Prionops alberti	Montane forest of east-central Democratic Republic of the Congo and adjacent southwestern Uganda.
	Red-billed helmetshrike	Prionops caniceps	West Africa.
	Rufous-bellied helmetshrike	Prionops rufiventris	Central Africa.
	Retz's helmetshrike	Prionops retzii	Central Africa.
	Gabela helmetshrike	Prionops gabela	Western Angola (Gabela escarpment).
	Chestnut-fronted helmetshrike	Prionops scopifrons	East and southeast Africa.

== Description and ecology ==
This is an African group of species which are found in scrub or open woodland. They are similar in feeding habits to shrikes, hunting insects and other small prey from a perch on a bush or tree.

Although similar in build to the shrikes, these tend to be colourful species with the distinctive crests or other head ornaments, such as wattles, from which they get their name.

Helmetshrikes are noisy and sociable birds, some of which breed in loose colonies. They lay 2–4 eggs in neat, well-hidden nests.
