= Buffalo Partial Reserve =

Protected area in Angola

- IUCN category IV (habitat/species management area)
- Location within Angola
- Location: Benguela Province, Angola
- Coordinates: 12°45′20″S 13°47′56″E
- Area: 400 km^{2} (150 sq mi)
- Designation: Partial Reserve
- Designated: 1974

Buffalo Partial Reserve is a protected area in Angola. It lies on the western slope of the Angolan highlands in Benguela Province, east of the city of Benguela.

The partial reserve covers an area of 400 km^{2}. It protects portions of the Angolan Miombo woodlands and Angolan scarp savanna and woodlands ecoregions.
