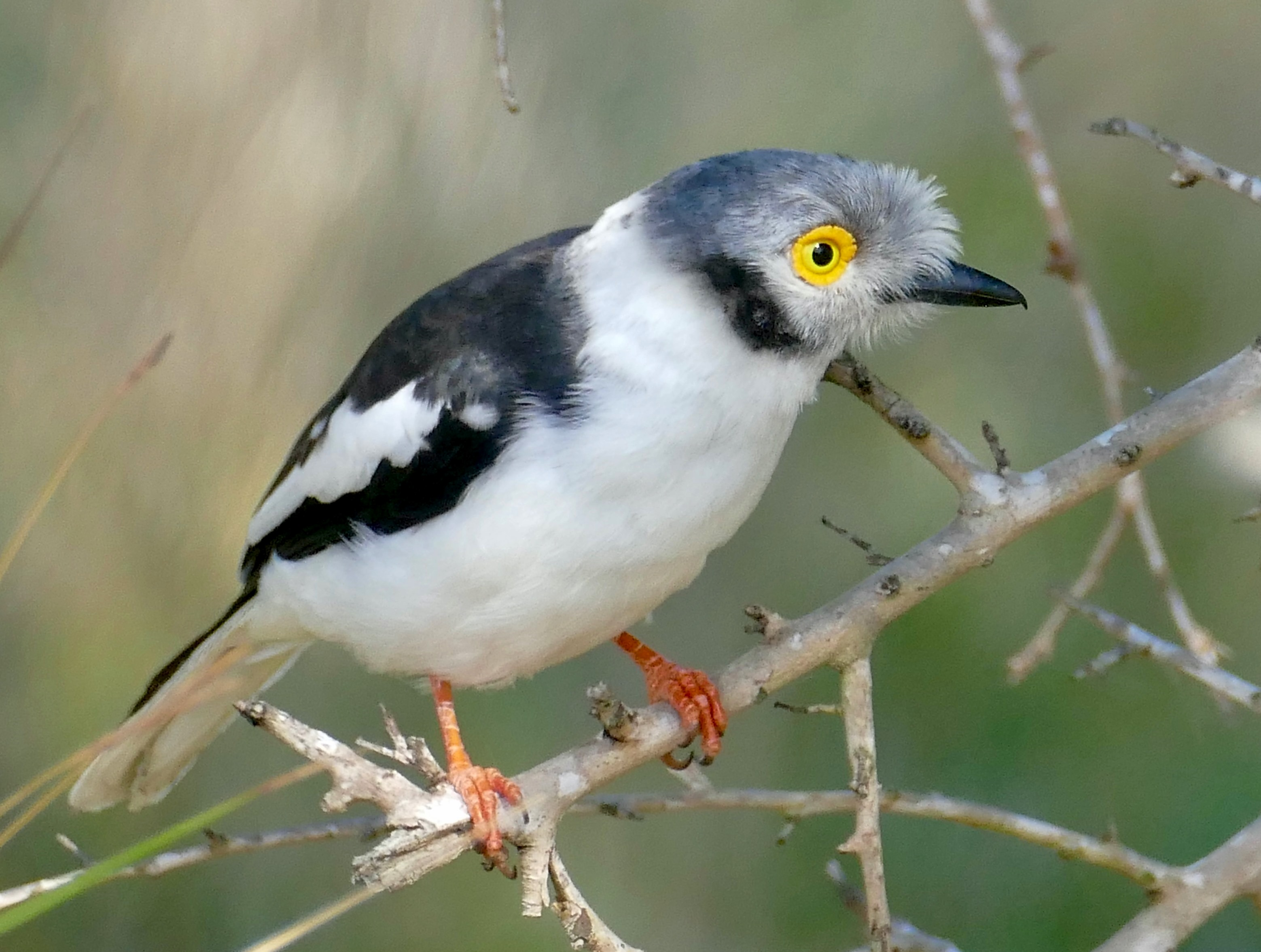
- Subspecies P. p. talacoma in the Kruger National Park, South Africa

Conservation status
- Least Concern (IUCN 3.1)

Scientific classification
- Kingdom: Animalia
- Phylum: Chordata
- Class: Aves
- Order: Passeriformes
- Family: Vangidae
- Genus: Prionops
- Species: P. plumatus

Binomial name
- Prionops plumatus (Shaw, 1809)
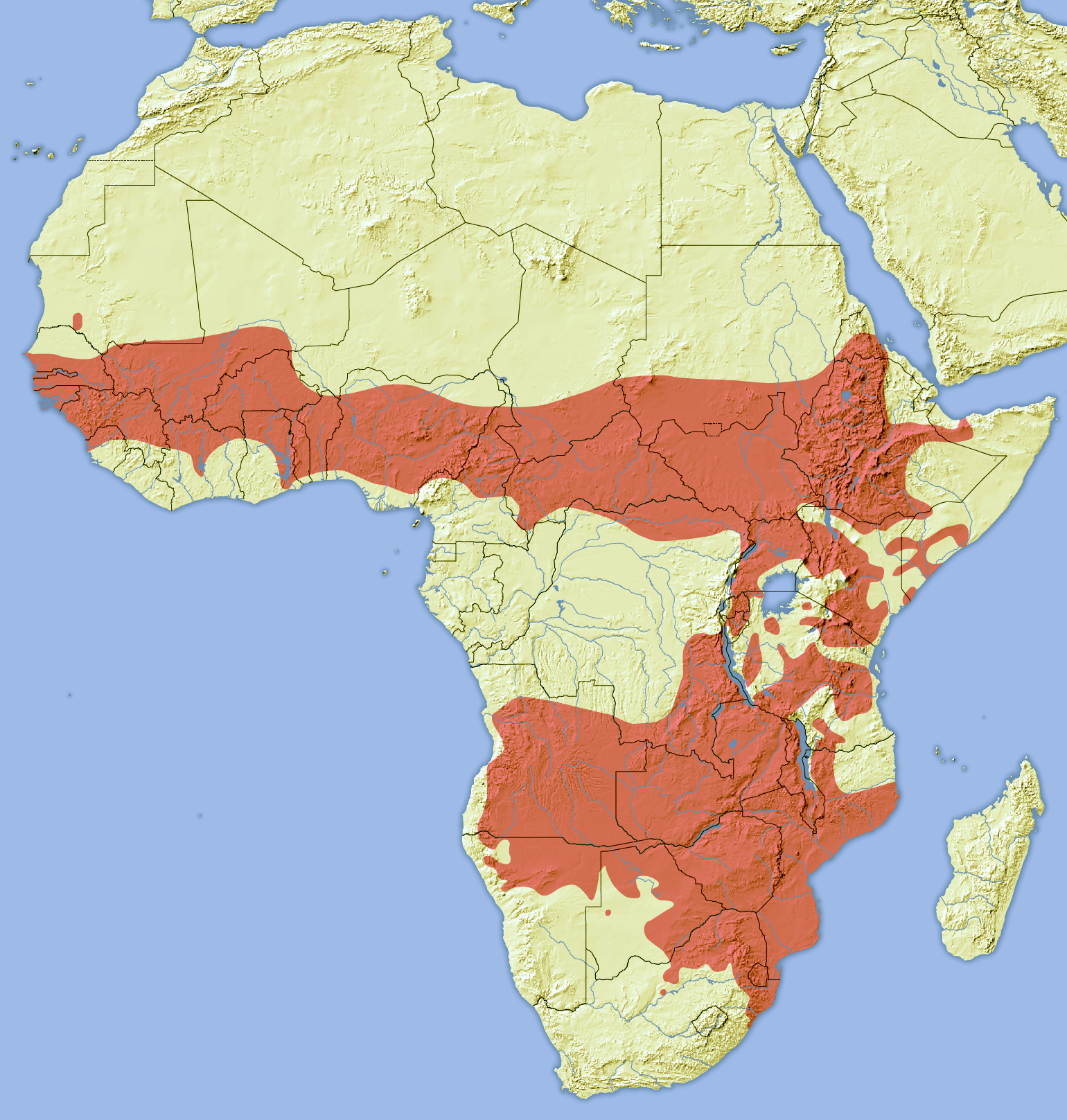
- range

= White-crested helmetshrike =

Species of bird

The white-crested helmetshrike (Prionops plumatus), also known as the white helmetshrike, is a species of passerine bird in the Vanga family Vangidae, formerly usually included in the Malaconotidae.

== Distribution and habitat ==
It is found in Angola, Benin, Botswana, Burkina Faso, Burundi, Cameroon, Central African Republic, Chad, Democratic Republic of the Congo, Ivory Coast, Eritrea, Eswatini, Ethiopia, Gambia, Ghana, Guinea, Guinea-Bissau, Kenya, Malawi, Mali, Mauritania, Mozambique, Namibia, Niger, Nigeria, Rwanda, Senegal, Sierra Leone, Somalia, South Africa, Sudan, Tanzania, Togo, Uganda, Zambia, and Zimbabwe.

Its natural habitats are subtropical or tropical dry forests, dry savanna, moist savanna, and subtropical or tropical dry shrubland.

== Behaviour ==
It is a gregarious bird and is found in small, active parties that are always on the move as they forage among the foliage or on the ground. They chatter noisily to one another as they move through their territory.

== Gallery ==
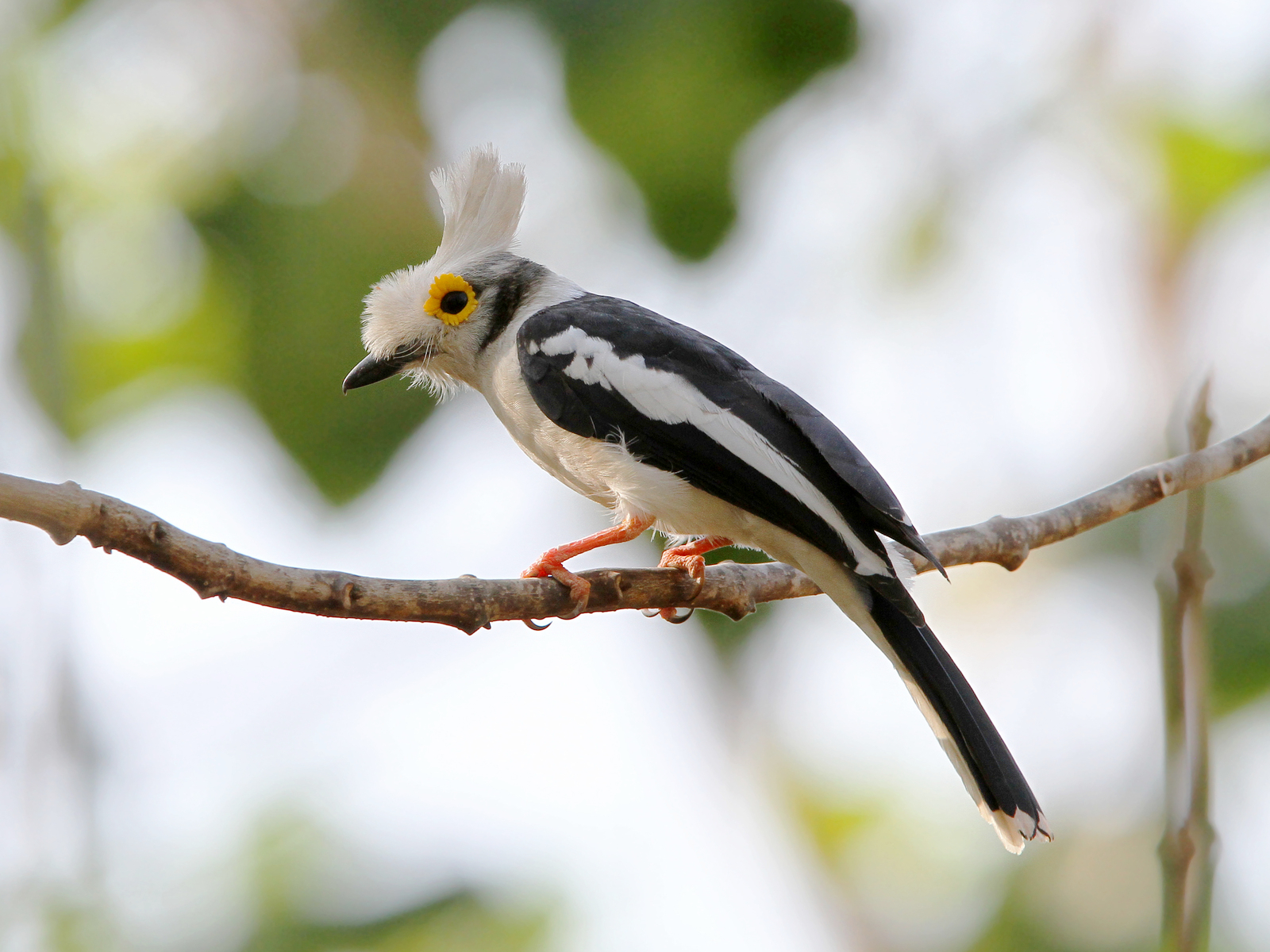
P. p. plumatus, at Kombo Central, Gambia

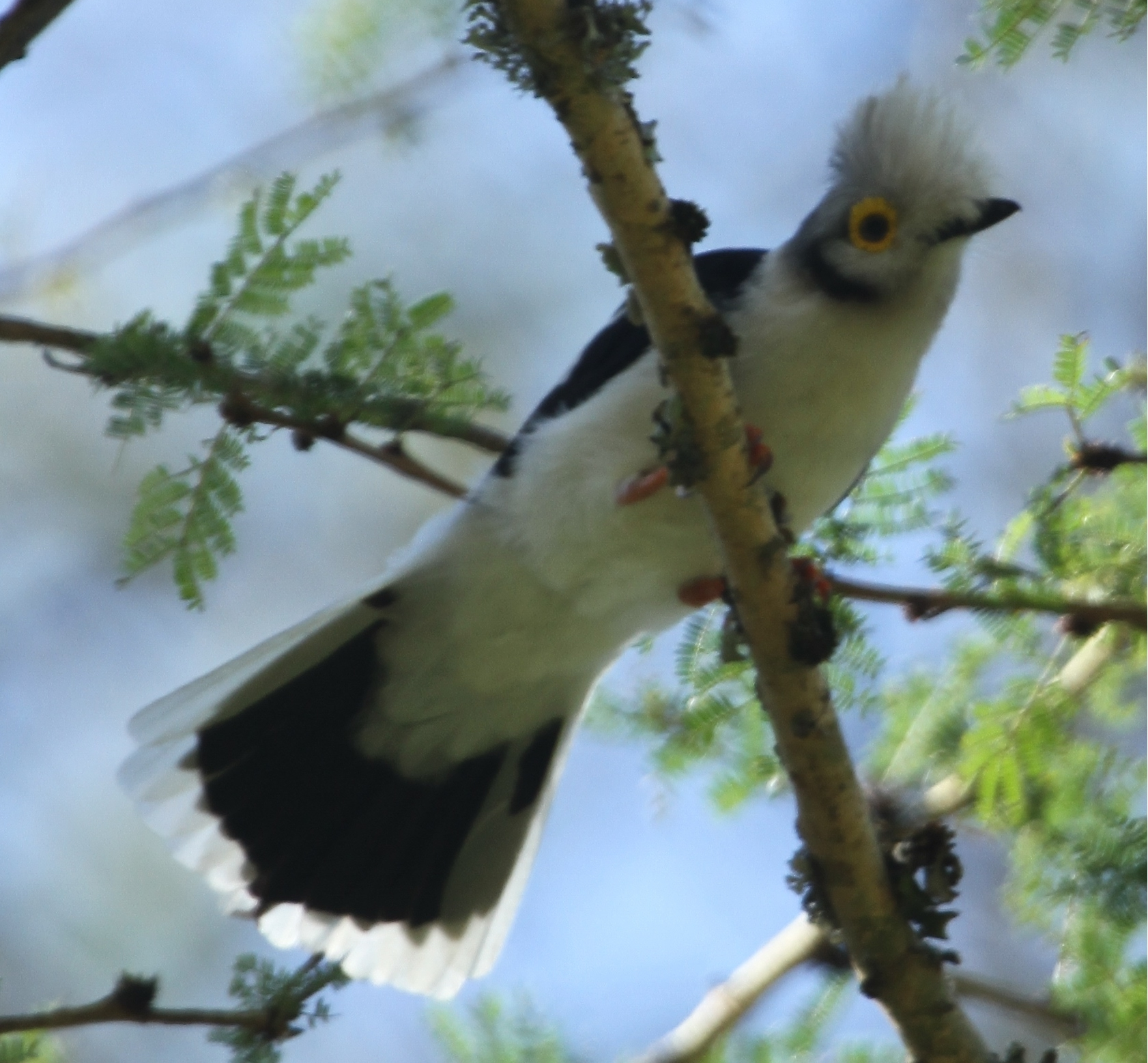
P. p. cristatus at Lake Nakuru ― curly-crested and closed wings largely black

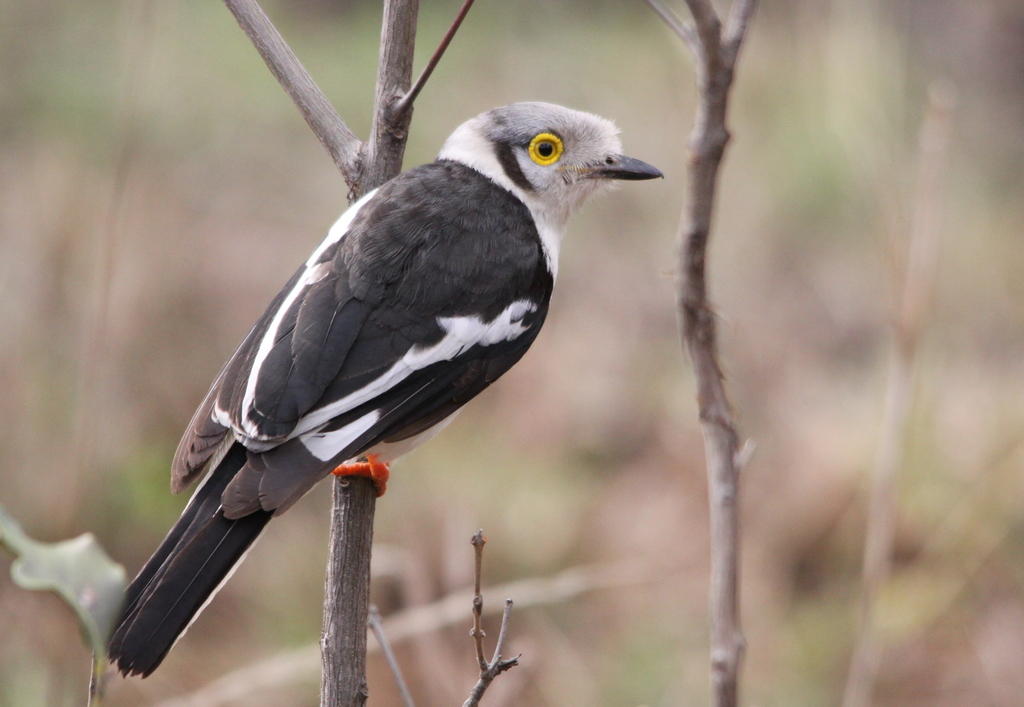
P. p. talacoma in South Africa

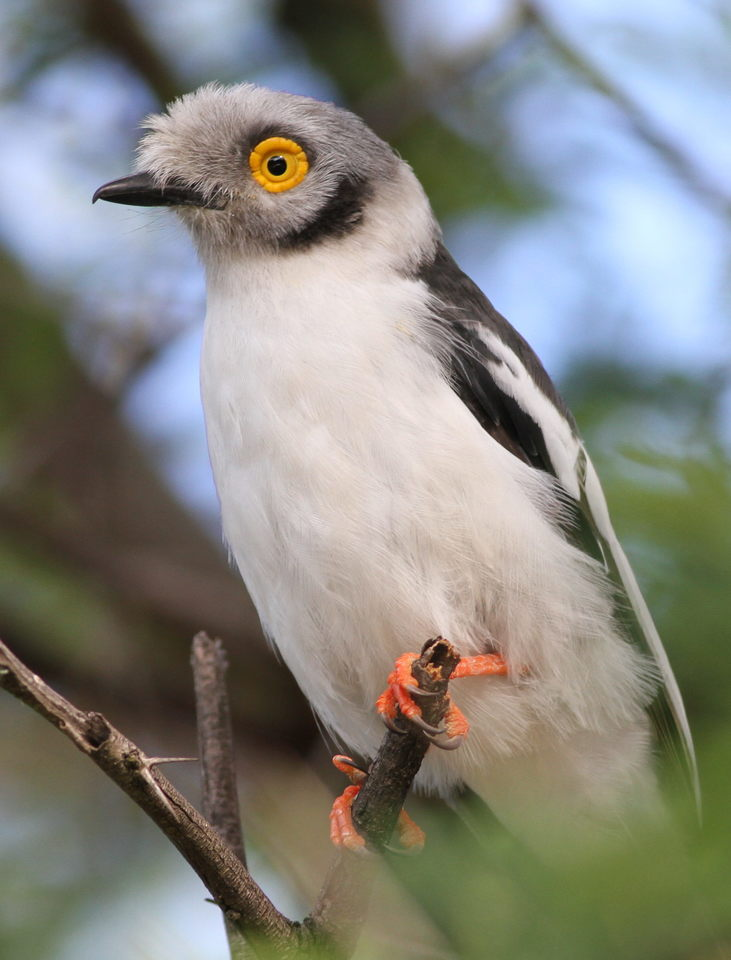
Marakele National Park, Limpopo, South Africa

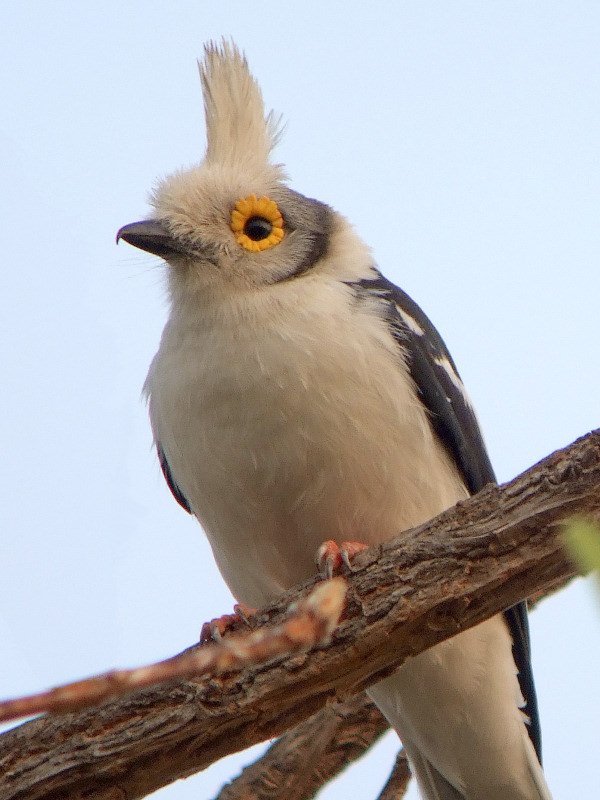
In Senegal
