= Baynes Hydroelectric Power Station =

Proposed power station in Angola and Namibia

- Location within Namibia
- Country: Namibia
- Location: Kunene Region
- Coordinates: 17°11′17″S 12°39′02″E
- Purpose: Power
- Status: Proposed
- Construction began: 2028 Expected
- Construction cost: US$1.3 billion
- Owners: Government of Angola & Government of Namibia (50/50)
- Operator: NamPower

Dam and spillways
- Impounds: Kunene River

Baynes Power Station
- Turbines: Francis-type; 2 x 71 MW (95,000 hp); 3 x 246.3 MW (330,300 hp)
- Installed capacity: 881 MW (1,181,000 hp)

The Baynes Hydroelectric Power Station is a planned 881 megawatts (1,181,440 hp) hydroelectric power plant in northwest Namibia, at the border with Angola. The power station is being developed jointly by the governments of Agola and Namibia along their joint border. The electricity generated will be shared 50/50 between the two neigboring countries.

== Location ==
The power station is located across the Kunene River, in the Kunene Region of Namibia, approximately 200 kilometres (124 mi) downstream of Ruacana Hydroelectric Power Station, at the international border with the Republic of Angola.

The location is at the foothills of the Baynes Mountains, approximately 750 kilometres (466 mi), by road, northwest of Windhoek, the capital and largest city of Namibia. The dam and power station would sit astride the border between Angola and Namibia.

== Overview ==
Before 2005, NamPower, the electricity supply parastatal in Namibia, maintained a Firm Power Contract (FPC) with Eskom of South Africa. That year, the contract expired and could not be renewed because South Africa was having a power shortage of its own. Joint feasibility studies, environmental and resettlement assessments, selected the present location, because it was the least disruptive to the environment and to the lives of the indigenous communities. The governments of Angola and Namibia decided to build a 600 megawatt power station and share the energy equally.

== Technical details ==
The dam consists of a rock fill embankment with a concrete face. The rock fill will be 12,000,000 cubic metres (423,776,001 cu ft). The maximum dam wall height will be 200 metres (656 ft), creating a reservoir that measures 43 kilometres (27 mi), long and a maximum width of 4 kilometres (2 mi). The resultant lake would have a surface area of 57 square kilometres (22 sq mi) and hold 2,650,000,000 cubic metres (9.3583866812×10^{10} cu ft) of water. Power will be generated by five Francis-type Vertical Axis turbines. Two turbines will each have capacity of 71 megawatts and three with 2463 megawatts capacity each.

Generation capacity was initially planned at 600 megawatts in 2020. Later, capacity was increased to 881 megawatts, with each country allocated to uptake 440.5 megawatts.

== Construction ==
The construction budget was initially calculated at US$1.2 billion. Construction was initially planned to start in 2021 and conclude in 2025. After completion, Angola and Namibia are expected to utilize 50 percent of the power output each. In April 2020, that timeline was pushed back; with construction starting in 2023 and commissioning in 2029.

In September 2026, Namibian online media reported that the start of construction had been pushed back to 2028.

== Funding ==
As of September 2026, funding arrangements were still ongoingg. The African Development Bank and the Development Bank of Namibia have indicated interest in participating in the funding for this renewable energy project.

== See also ==
- List of power stations in Angola
- List of power stations in Namibia
