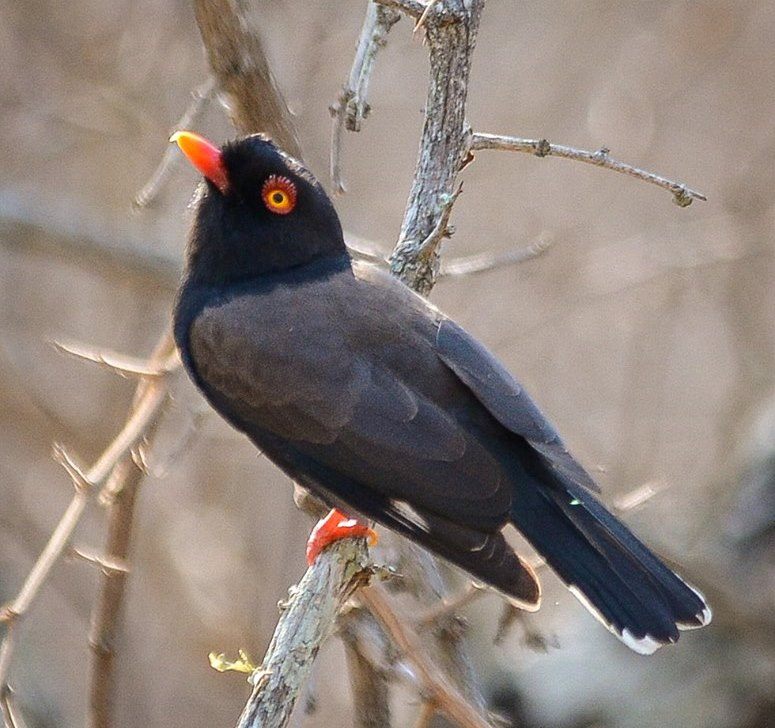
- Prionops retzii tricolor from South Africa

Conservation status
- Least Concern (IUCN 3.1)

Scientific classification
- Kingdom: Animalia
- Phylum: Chordata
- Class: Aves
- Order: Passeriformes
- Family: Vangidae
- Genus: Prionops
- Species: P. retzii

Binomial name
- Prionops retzii Wahlberg, 1856

Audio
- Calls of the nominate subspecies from South Africa

= Retz's helmetshrike =

Species of bird

Retz's helmetshrike (Prionops retzii) is a species of bird in the helmetshrike family Vangidae, formerly usually included in the Malaconotidae.

== Subspecies ==
Four subspecies are recognized:

- Prionops retzii nigricans (Neumann, 1899) – south central Africa
- Prionops retzii graculinus Cabanis, 1868 – East Africa
- Prionops retzii retzii Wahlberg, 1856 – northern parts of southern Africa
- Prionops retzii tricolor G.R. Gray, 1864 – eastern and southeastern Africa

== Range and habitat ==
It is found in Angola, Botswana, DRC, Eswatini, Kenya, Malawi, Mozambique, Namibia, Somalia, South Africa, Tanzania, Zambia, and Zimbabwe. Its natural habitats are subtropical or tropical dry forests, subtropical or tropical mangrove forests, and subtropical or tropical moist shrubland.

== Gallery ==
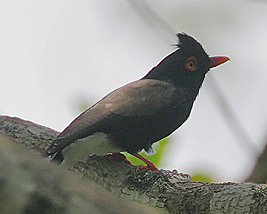
P. r. graculinus in eastern Kenya

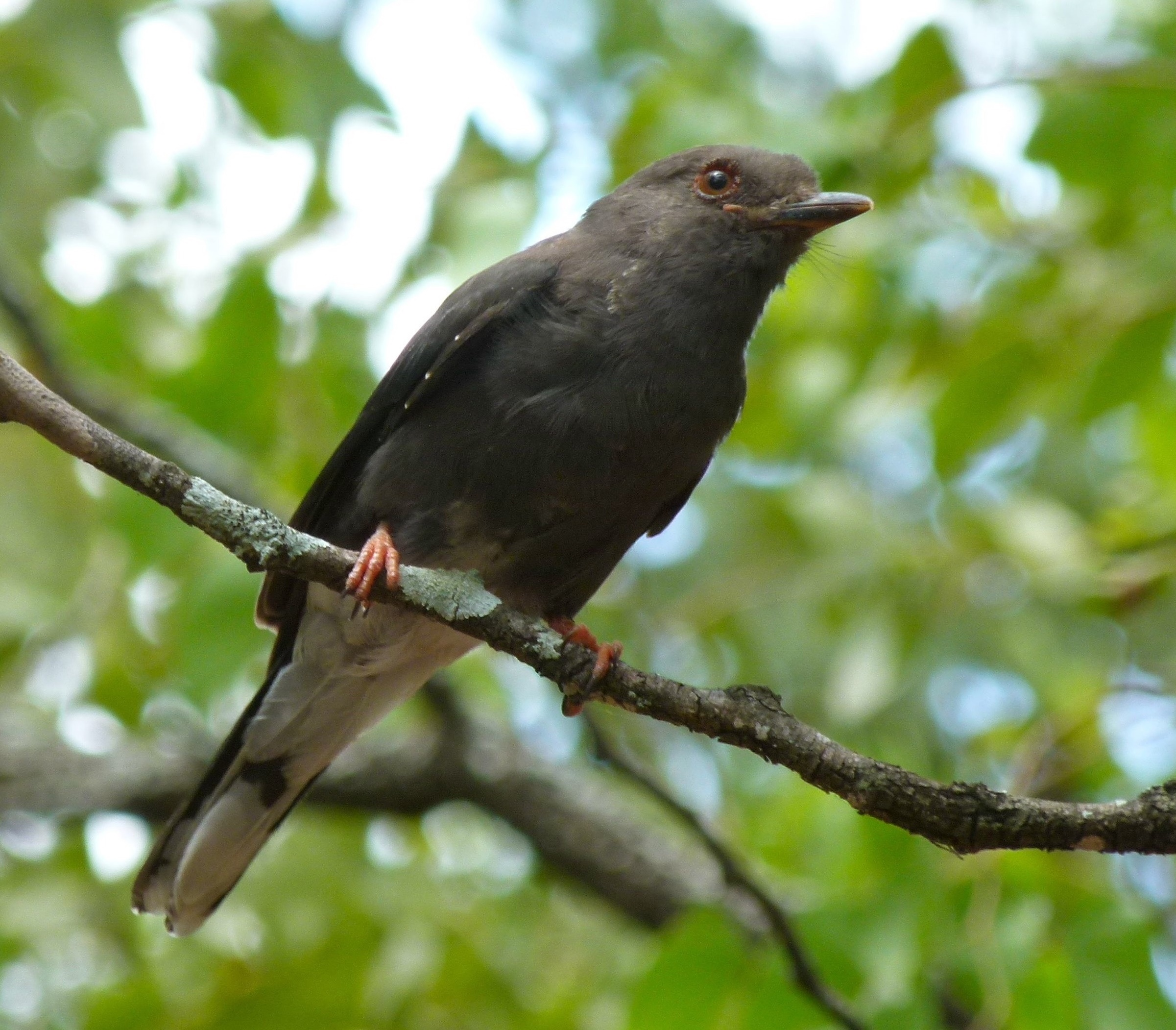
P. r. tricolor, juvenile in Kruger Park

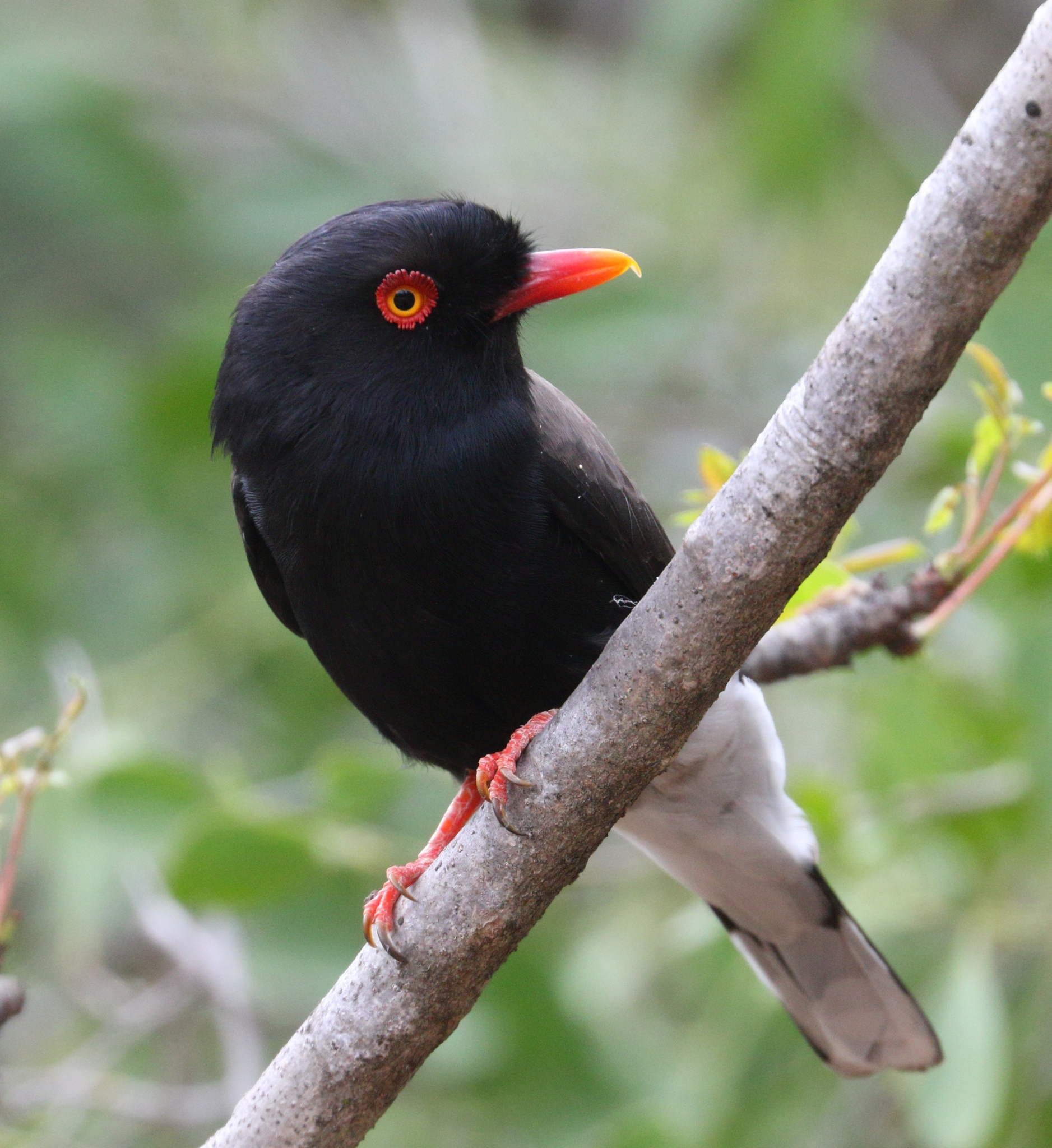
South Africa

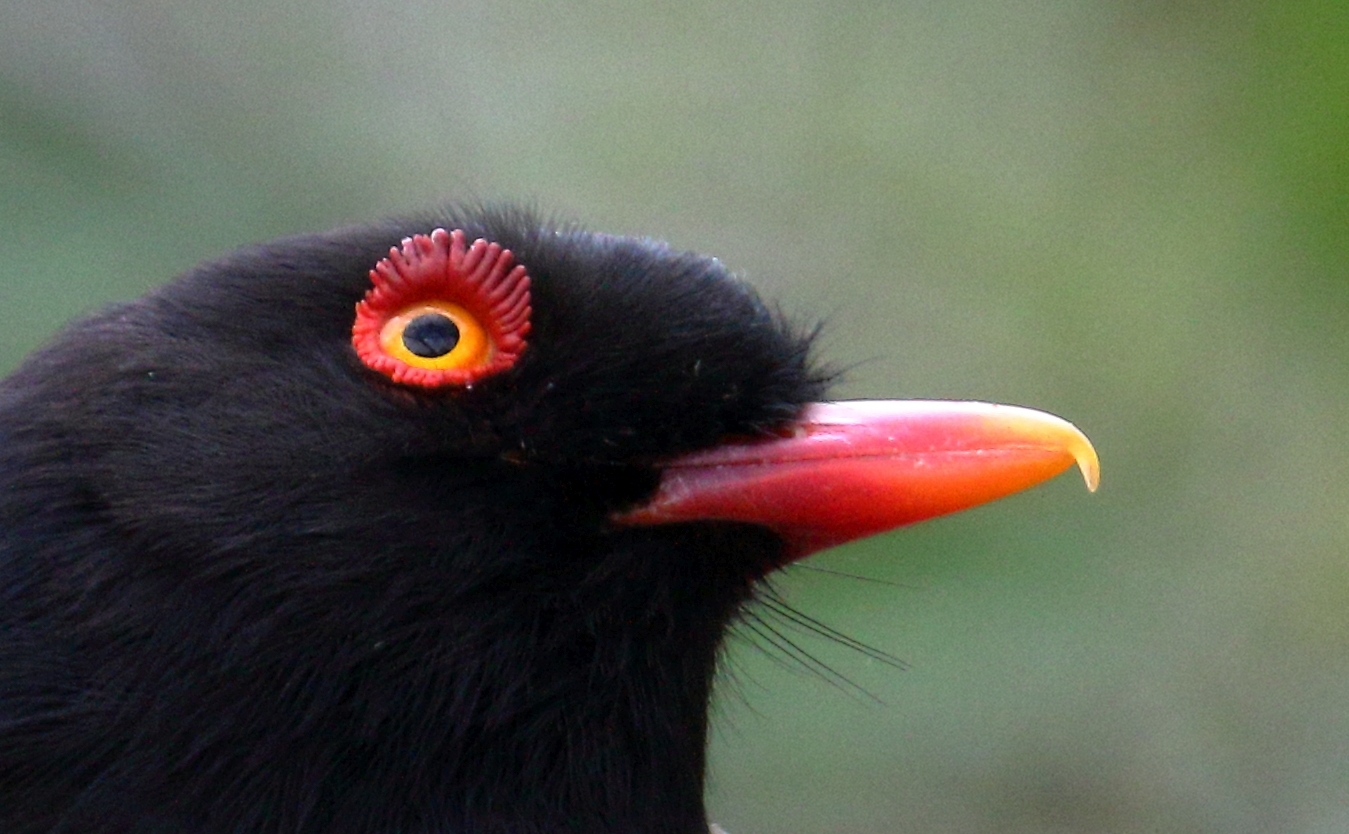
