= Matala Hydroelectric Power Station =

Hydroelectric power station in Angola

Matala Dam
- Location of Matala Power Station; Placement on map is approximate Matala Dam (Africa) Matala Dam (Earth)
- Location: Matala, Angola
- Coordinates: 14°44′38″S 15°02′31″E
- Opening date: 1954
- Owner: PRODEL

Dam and spillways
- Impounds: Kunene River

Power Station
- Operator: Empresa Publica de Producao de Electricidade (PRODEL)
- Commission date: 1954
- Turbines: 4
- Installed capacity: 40 MW (54,000 hp)

The Matala Power Station is a hydroelectric power station across the Kunene River, in Angola, that has installed generation capacity of 40 MW (54,000 hp). The power station came online in 1954.

== Location ==
The power station lies on the banks of the Kunene River, in the town of Matala, in Huíla Province, in southwestern Angola. Matala is located approximately 175 kilometres (109 mi), by road, east of the city of Lubango, the provincial capital. This is approximately 985 kilometres (612 mi), by road, southeast of the city of Luanda, the capital of Angola.

== History ==
In 1954, Matala Dam was commissioned with a dual purpose of providing water for irrigation to the region and supplying electricity to southwestern Angola. The original installed capacity of 39 megawatts was never achieved, but subsequent repairs in 2001, 2011 and 2016 have attempted to achieve generation capacity of at least 40 megawatts.

== Specifications ==
The Matala dam has a weir measuring in excess of 700 metres (2,297 ft), in length. Other components of the complex include an inlet, an outlet, movable gates, electrical mechanical hardware, powerlines and switching gear. The dam creates a reservoir with a mean surface area of 41 square kilometres (10,000 acres), with storage capacity of 60,000,000 cubic metres (2.118880003×10^{9} cu ft).

== Repairs and refurbishment ==
Established in 1954, the dam has been repaired in 2001 and 2011. In 2011, Empresa Publica de Producao de Electricidade (PRODEL), the owner of the power station hired SNC Lavalin Inc., a Canadian enterprise to "improve the facility’s safety and its water storage capacity" at a contract price of US$249.6 million. The repairs were carried out in phases.

== See also ==
- List of power stations in Angola
