= Luena Solar Power Station =

Solar power station in Angola

- Country: Angola
- Location: Luena, Moxico Province
- Coordinates: 11°47′52″S 19°59′26″E
- Status: Under construction
- Construction began: July 2022
- Commission date: July 2024 (Expected)
- Construction cost: US$39.13 million (€36.97 million)
- Owner: Ministry of Energy and Water, Angola
- Operator: Empresa Pública de Produção de Electricidade (PRODEL)

Solar farm
- Type: Flat-panel PV

Power generation
- Units planned: 43000
- Nameplate capacity: 26.91 MW (36,090 hp)

The Luena Solar Power Station is a 26.91 MW (36,090 hp) solar power plant under construction in Luena, Angola. The power station is in development by a consortium comprising MCA Group, a Portuguese engineering and construction conglomerate, and Sun Africa, a renewable energy project developer based in Miami, Florida, United States.

== Location ==
The power station is located near the town of Luena, the capital of Angola's Moxico Province, in eastern Angola, approximately 1,130 kilometres (702 mi), by road, southeast of Luanda, the country's capital.

== Overview ==
The solar park is a ground-mounted solar panel design comprising 43,000 solar photovoltaic panels, with total generation capacity of 26.906 megawatts. The renewable energy infrastructure facility is owned by the Ministry of Energy and Water, Angola. Following commercial commissioning the power station is expected to be operated by Empresa Pública de Produção de Electricidade (PRODEL-EP), the national electricity generation company. The construction site is reported to measure 52 hectares (130 acres).

== Developers ==
The table below illustrates the corporate entities who own a stake in the special purpose vehicle (SPV) company "Luena Solar Consortium", which won the contract to develop the power station.

Luena Solar Consortium Shareholding
Rank	Name of Owner	Domicile	Ownership (%)	Notes
1	MCA Group	Portugal		
2	MCA Vias SA	Angola		
3	Sun Africa	United States		

== Construction and cost ==
Construction began in 2022 and commercial commissioning is expected in 2024. The construction cost is reported as US$39.129 million (€36.973 million).

== Other considerations ==
The power generated by the power station is expected to supply the town of Luena, which was supplied in the past by aging "fossil fuel sources". The solar farm is expected to reduce fuel consumption by approximately 19,515 liters daily, the fuel consumption of the area's thermal power plants.

== See also ==
- List of power stations in Angola
- Quilemba Solar Power Station
