= Technopromexport =

Russian engineering company active in the power sector

Technopromexport OAO
- Type: Public (OAO)
- Industry: Engineering
- Founded: 1955
- Headquarters: Moscow, Russia
- Services: Power engineering construction
- Revenue: ▲RUR 23.8 billion
- Net income: ▲RUR 185.5 million
- Number of employees: more than 650
- Parent: Rostec
- Website: tpe-vo.ru

Technopromexport (Russian: Технопромэкспорт) is a Russian engineering company that builds energy facilities in Russia and abroad, including hydropower, thermal, geo-thermal and diesel power plants, power lines and electricity substations. The company was formed in 1955, and was transformed into a joint stock company in April 2006. The company's charter capital is 15.7 billion rubles. The company is headquartered in Moscow.

The company is engaged in construction of turnkey power engineering facilities including hydro power plants, thermal power plants, geothermal power plant, and diesel power plants, power transmission lines, and substations. Also, the company is involved in modernization and reconstruction of the existing power engineering facilities, comprehensive post-warranty service of the power engineering facilities, equipment delivery, construction of industrial and infrastructural facilities, and production of thermal and electric energy. Technopromexport carries out works within the structure of the EPC/EPCM contracts.

== History ==
The company was founded in 1955. It was specialized in construction of power engineering facilities under the programs of cooperation with the countries of socialist orientation. During these years, Technopromexport implemented more than 400 power engineering projects in 50 countries of the world, among them the Aswan Hydropower Complex (Egypt), the Euphrates Hydrocomplex (Syria), the Hòa Bình Dam hydroelectric power station (Vietnam), and others.

During the Yuri Andropov times it was the center of a major corruption case, which ended in executions of its director Yuri P. Smelyakov and his deputy, V.A. Pavlov.

Since 1993, the company is present in the Russian power engineering market.

In 2006, the legal form changed from federal state unitary enterprise to open joint stock company. Since 2009, Technopromexport is a part of the Rostec state corporation. Technopromexport stands as observer in Electric Power Council of the CIS countries.

By the end of 2011, the total value of projects implemented under the Technopromexport management has exceeded 80 billion rubles. The company's revenue in 2011 was 23.8 billion rubles, and the net profit reached 185.5 million rubles.

The company has a stake in Interautomatika, a joint venture with Siemens that the German group exited in July 2017.

== Operation ==
The company is engaged in the construction of turnkey energy facilities, including hydraulic, thermal, geothermal, diesel power plants, power transmission lines and substations. The company also carries out modernization and reconstruction of existing power facilities, comprehensive post-warranty maintenance of power facilities, supply of equipment, construction of industrial and infrastructure facilities and production of heat and electricity. Technopromexport performs works included in the structure of EPC/EPCM contracts.

Construction of thermal power plants

Since 1956, Technopromexport has commissioned thermal power plants in countries such as Bulgaria, Hungary, Poland, Greece, Vietnam, China, Mongolia, Iran, Iraq, etc. The range of introduced capacities is from 8 MW to 5200 MW. Technopromexport carries out the construction of thermal power plants based on a traditional and combined cycle, using all types of fuels (coal and brown coal, lignites, fuel oil, diesel fuel), with a capacity from 72 to 1600 MW, including the entire line of CCGT (combined cycle gas plants) in capacity — 120, 230, 325, 400, 450 MW.

Construction of hydroelectric power plants

Technopromexport has carried out the construction of hydroelectric power plants in a number of countries in Europe, Asia, Africa and Latin America. Technopromexport carries out the construction of hydroelectric power plants with a capacity from several units to 2,100MW, with remote control units, with underground power stations.

Construction of a geo-electric power plant

In 2002, Technopromexport commissioned the Mutnovskaya Geoenergy plant with a capacity of 50 MW in Kamchatka. Technopromexport carries out the construction of stations using geothermal heat of the Earth.

Construction of power lines and substations

Technopromexport has built power transmission lines with a total length of more than 30 thousand km with a voltage of up to 750 kV inclusive. Among the implemented projects are the construction of the combined energy system of Egypt and Cuba, as well as the 500 kV New Suez — Abu-Zaabal power line in Egypt, the 400 kV Burfellslina - 3A power line in Iceland, the 220 kV Alai-Batken power line in Kyrgyzstan and others.

== Projects ==
Among the largest Russian projects implemented by the company are:

- 2002 — construction of Mutnovskaya geothermal power plant.
- 2006 — construction of two 450-MW CCGT units of North-Western TPP.
- 2007 and 2012 — construction of two 325-MW CCGT units of Ivanovskie CCGT-325.
- 2008 — construction of 121-MW CCGT power unit of Mezhdunarodnaya TPP.
- 2010 — construction of 450-MW CCGT power unit of Kaliningradskaya TPP-2.
- 2011 — construction of 450-MW CCGT power unit of Yuzhnaya TPP-22.

At the end of the year 2013, the company is implementing the following projects:

- Cherepetskaya PP (Russia) — construction on a turn-key basis of 2 coal power units, capacity 225 MW each.
- Nizhnevartovskaya PP (Russia) — construction on a turn-key basis of CCGT power unit of 400 MW.
- HPP "Naglu" (Afghanistan) — modernization of the 94-MW hydroelectric power plant.
- TPP "Ghorazal" (Bangladesh) — reconstruction of the 55-MW power unit.
- TPP "Barh" (India) — construction of boiler island, 1980 MW.
- TPP "Harta" (Iraq) — restoration of two power units, 200 MW each.
- TPP "Sisak-3" (Croatia) — construction on a turn-key basis of the CCGT power unit of 230 MW.
- HPP "Polotskaya" (Belarus) — construction on a turn-key basis of the 22-MW hydroelectric power plant.
- TPP "Jijel" (Algeria) — repair of power units, equipment delivery.
- HPP "Kapanda" (Angola) — hydroelectric unit repair, equipment delivery, supervision.

== Owners and management ==
As of 2024, 100% of the shares of Technopromexport belong to the Rostec State Corporation and Alexander Nikolaevich Pronin was made General Director.

Since 1955, the company had been headed by the following people:

- Gromov A.А. (1955–1956);
- Ivanov V.D. (1957–1958);
- Babarin E.I. (1958–1960);
- Golovanov V.S. (1960–1968);
- Maklakov A.C. (1968–1976);
- Smelyakov Yu.V. (1976–1983);
- Postovalov A.S. (1983–1990);
- Bokov S.М. (1990–1997);
- Kuznetsov V.A. (1998–2003);
- Molozhavy S.V. (2003–2009);
- Lukin A.A. (2009–2010);
- Kalanov A.B. (2010–2011);
- Isaev O.Y. (2011–2012);
- Minchenko U.V. (2012–2013);
- Topor-Gilka S.A. (2013–2020);
- Borodin Victor Nikolaevich (2020–2024);
- Pronin Alexander Nikolaevich (2024–present, as of June 2024).
