= Barboza's leaf-toed gecko =

Conservation status
- Least Concern (IUCN 3.1)

Scientific classification
- Kingdom: Animalia
- Phylum: Chordata
- Class: Reptilia
- Order: Squamata
- Suborder: Gekkota
- Family: Gekkonidae
- Genus: Hemidactylus
- Species: H. bayonii

Binomial name
- Hemidactylus bayonii Bocage, 1893

Synonyms
- Hemidactylus bayoniI Bocage, 1893; Hemidactylus bayoni [sic] — Laurent, 1964; Hemidactylus bayonii — Wermuth, 1965

Species of lizard

Barboza's leaf-toed gecko (Hemidactylus bayonii) is a species of lizard in the family Gekkonidae. The species is endemic to Angola.

== Etymology ==
The specific name, bayonii, is in honor of Portuguese naturalist Francisco Antonio Pinheiro Bayão, who was a planter and administrator in Angola.

== Habitat ==
The preferred natural habitat of H. bayonii is shrubland, at altitudes from sea level to 900 m (3,000 ft).

== Description ==
Small for its genus, H. bayonii may attain a snout-to-vent length (SVL) of about 3.5 cm (1.4 in).

== Reproduction ==
H. bayonii is oviparous.
