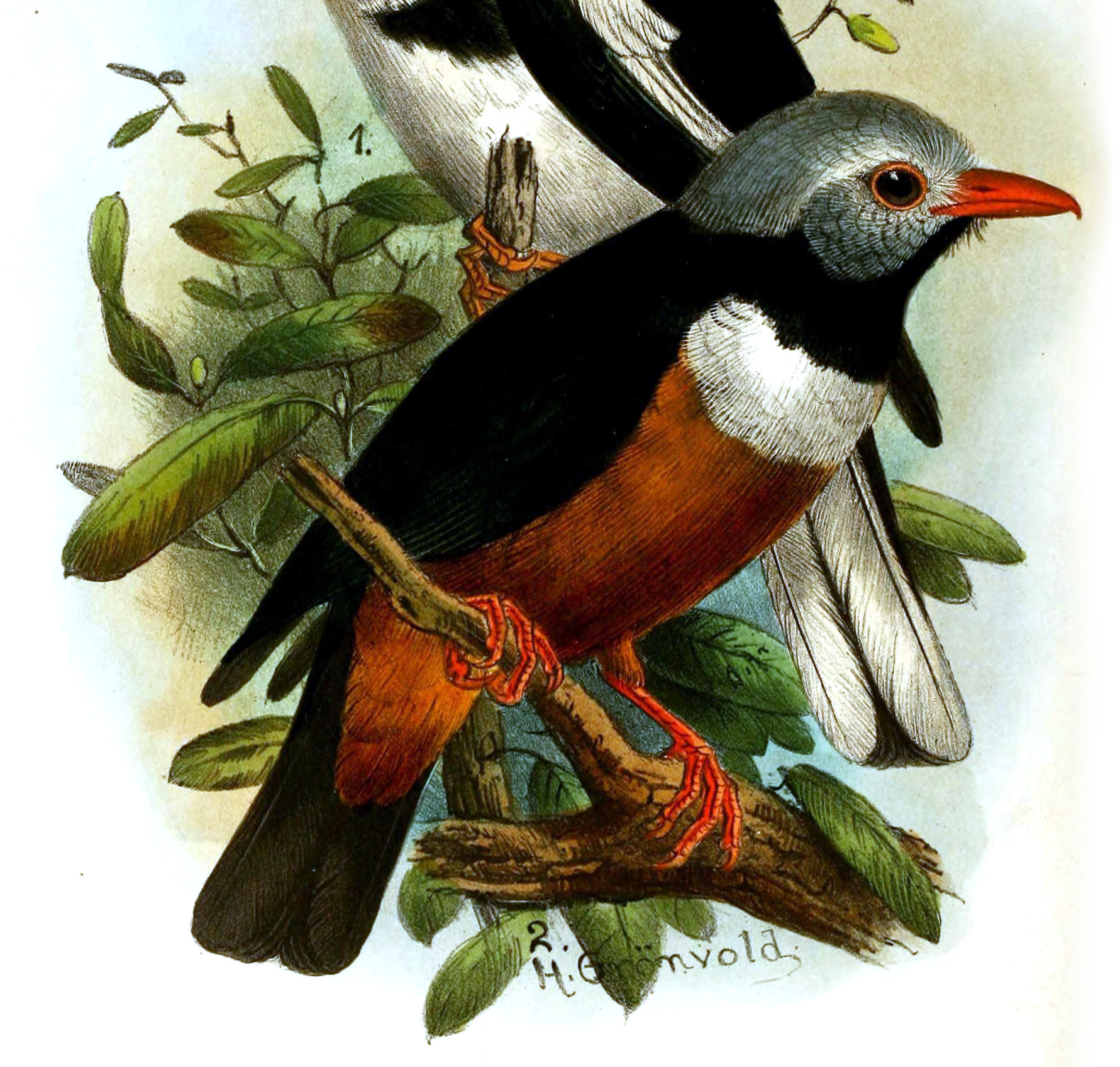

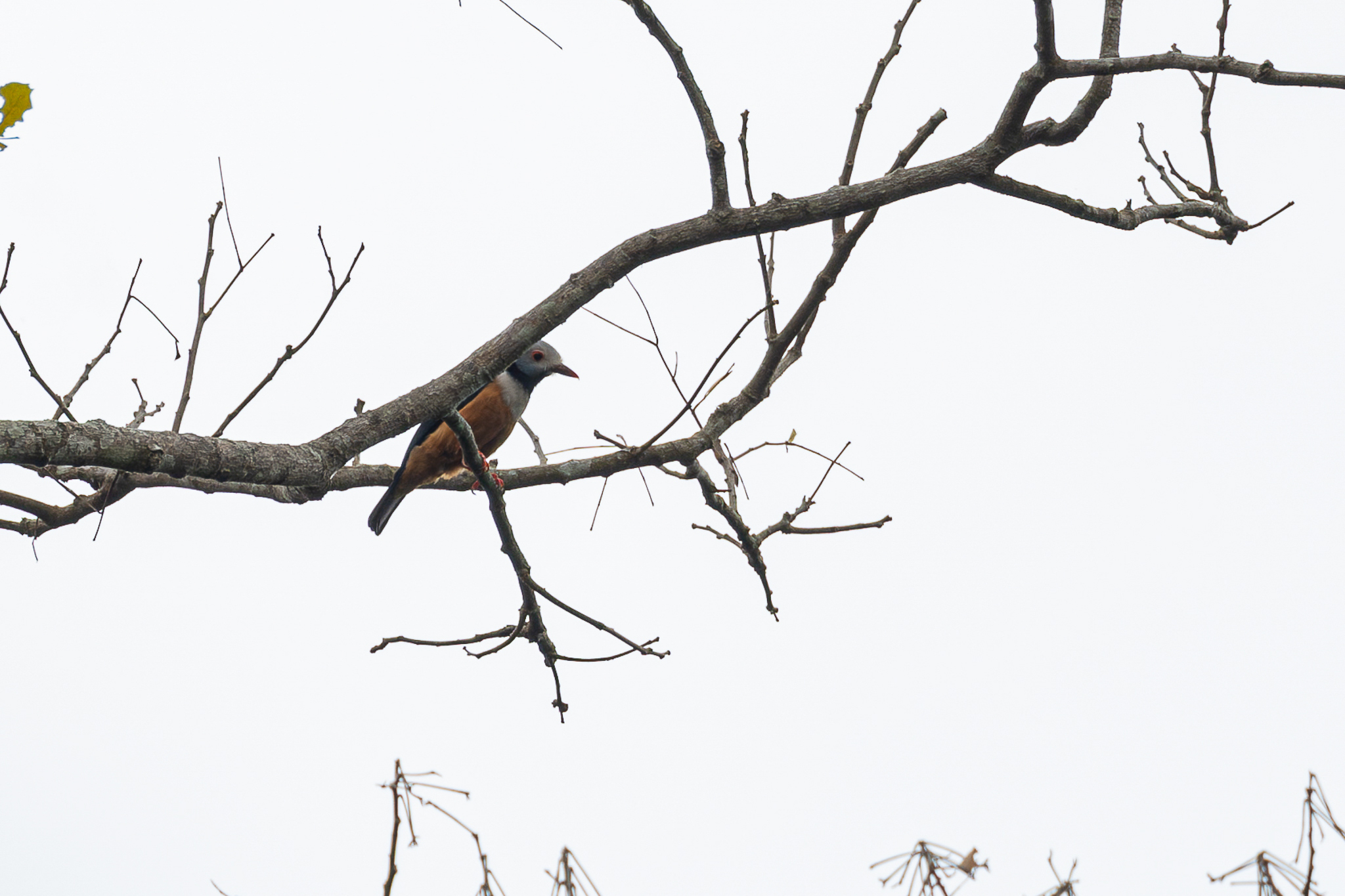

Conservation status
- Least Concern (IUCN 3.1)

Scientific classification
- Kingdom: Animalia
- Phylum: Chordata
- Class: Aves
- Order: Passeriformes
- Family: Vangidae
- Genus: Prionops
- Species: P. rufiventris

Binomial name
- Prionops rufiventris (Bonaparte, 1853)

= Rufous-bellied helmetshrike =

Species of bird

The rufous-bellied helmetshrike or Gabon helmetshrike (Prionops rufiventris) is a passerine bird belonging to the Vanga family, Vangidae. It inhabits tropical forest in Central Africa. It is sometimes included within the chestnut-bellied helmetshrike (P. caniceps) of West Africa.

== Description ==
It is 20–22 cm long. The adult has glossy black upperparts and throat and reddish-brown underparts with a narrow white breastband. The top and sides of the head and the chin are pale blue-grey and there are bushy whitish feathers on the forehead. The wings are broad and rounded with a white band across the primaries. The bill, legs and feet are orange-red and the eye is yellow with a bare orange-red ring around it. The eastern subspecies P. r. mentalis has darker underparts and a grey-brown eye. Juvenile birds are duller than the adults and have a pale buff-white breast and belly and a largely whitish head. The bill is blackish and the legs and feet are dark orange.

It is a noisy bird with a variety of complex chattering and whistling calls. Birds often call together in a duet or chorus. They also make bill-snapping sounds and the wings produce a sound during flight.

== Distribution and habitat ==
The western subspecies P. r. rufiventris is found in southern Cameroon, mainland Equatorial Guinea, south-west Central African Republic, northern and western Gabon, Cabinda and parts of the Republic of Congo and north-western Democratic Republic of Congo. P. r. mentalis occurs in central and eastern Democratic Republic of Congo and western Uganda and formerly occurred in Rwanda.

The species is found mainly in lowland forest up to 1,450 m above sea-level. It occurs in primary and mature secondary forest and in gallery forest along rivers. It is locally common and does not appear to be threatened.

== Behaviour ==
Its behaviour has been little-studied. It typically feeds in pairs or small groups and often joins mixed-species feeding flocks. It most often forages around the middle level of trees at 10–30 m above the ground. It makes short flights to catch prey or gleans items from small branches. The diet consists of insects and other arthropods. The bird appears to breed in groups with one dominant pair helped by the others.
