= Cutato River =

River in central Angola

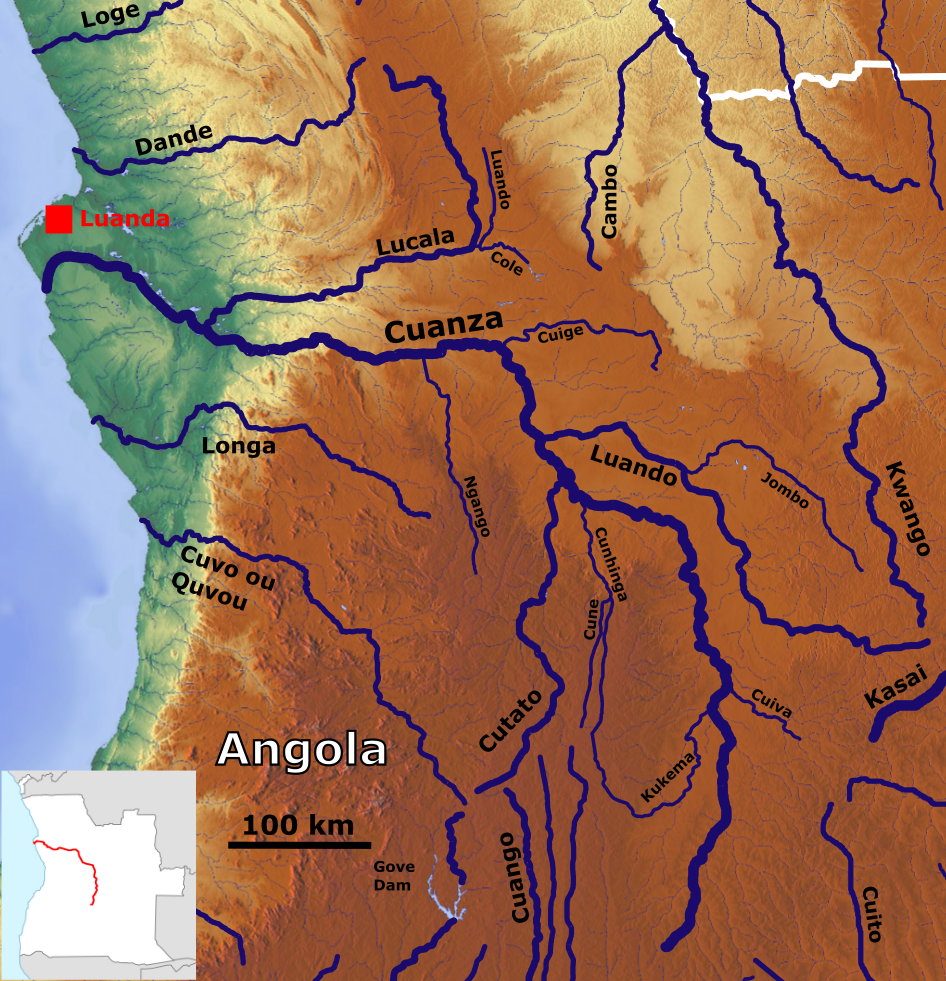
- The Cuanza River System with the Cutato River (center bottom)

Location
- Country: Angola

Physical characteristics
- Mouth: Cuanza River
  - coordinates: 10.5728°S 16.6050°E

The Cutato is a river of central Angola, tributary of the Cuanza River. It flows to the northeast of Benguela. The town of Cutato lies on the river.
