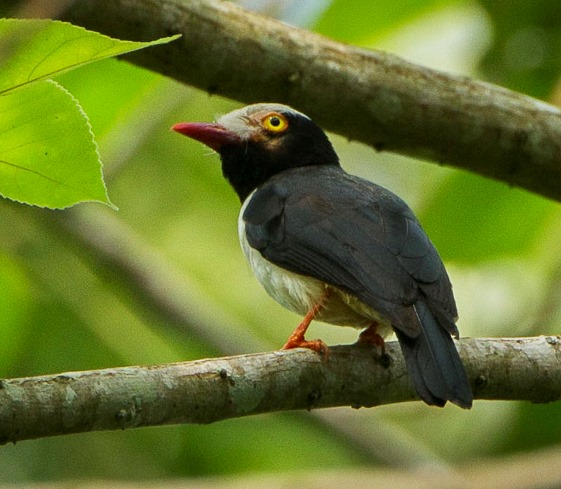

Conservation status
- Least Concern (IUCN 3.1)

Scientific classification
- Kingdom: Animalia
- Phylum: Chordata
- Class: Aves
- Order: Passeriformes
- Family: Vangidae
- Genus: Prionops
- Species: P. caniceps

Binomial name
- Prionops caniceps (Bonaparte, 1850)

= Red-billed helmetshrike =

Species of bird

The red-billed helmetshrike or chestnut-bellied helmetshrike (Prionops caniceps) is a species of bird in the Vanga family, Vangidae, formerly usually included in the Malaconotidae.

It is native to the Guinean Forests of West Africa. In Central Africa it is replaced by the rufous-bellied helmet-shrike (P. rufiventris); both are sometimes regarded as two subspecies of the "chestnut-bellied helmetshrike".

Its natural habitats are subtropical or tropical moist lowland forest and subtropical or tropical moist shrubland.
