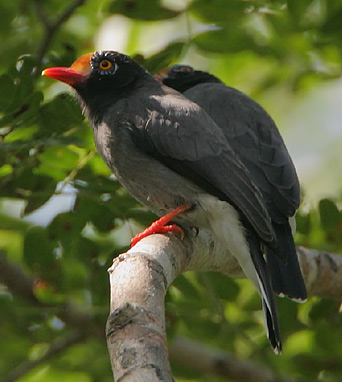
- Subspecies kirki in Arabuko-Sokoke Forest, Coastal Kenya

Conservation status
- Least Concern (IUCN 3.1)

Scientific classification
- Kingdom: Animalia
- Phylum: Chordata
- Class: Aves
- Order: Passeriformes
- Family: Vangidae
- Genus: Prionops
- Species: P. scopifrons

Binomial name
- Prionops scopifrons (Peters, 1854)

= Chestnut-fronted helmetshrike =

Species of bird

The chestnut-fronted helmetshrike (Prionops scopifrons) is a species of bird in the Vanga family Vangidae, formerly usually included in the Malaconotidae.

It is found in Kenya, Mozambique, Somalia, South Africa, Tanzania, and Zimbabwe. Its natural habitats are subtropical or tropical dry forests, subtropical or tropical dry shrubland, and subtropical or tropical moist shrubland found around the equator.
