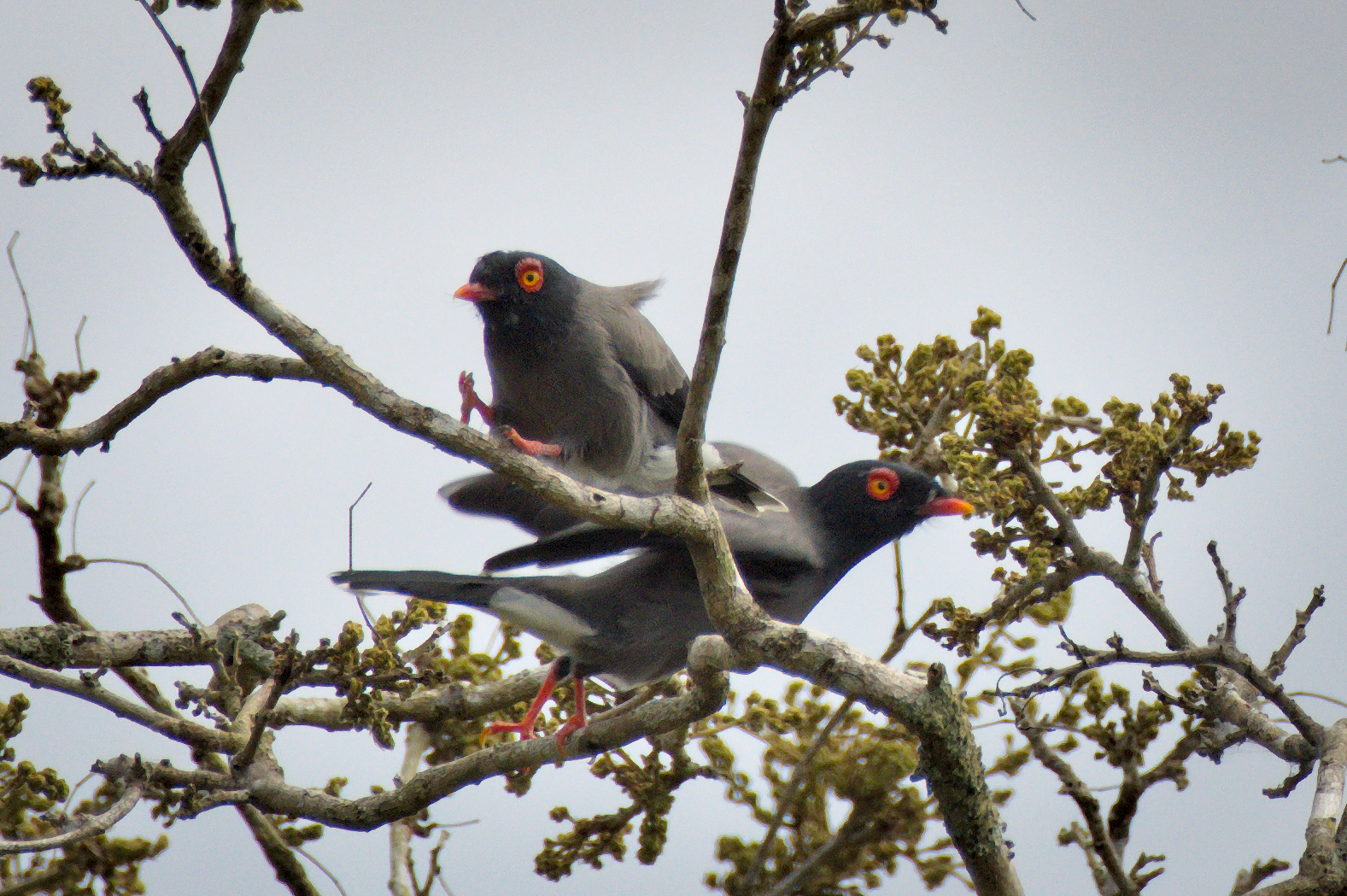

Conservation status
- Endangered (IUCN 3.1)

Scientific classification
- Kingdom: Animalia
- Phylum: Chordata
- Class: Aves
- Order: Passeriformes
- Family: Vangidae
- Genus: Prionops
- Species: P. gabela

Binomial name
- Prionops gabela Rand, 1957

= Gabela helmetshrike =

Species of bird

The Gabela helmetshrike (Prionops gabela) is a species of bird in the Vanga family Vangidae, formerly usually included in the Malaconotidae.

It is endemic to Angola.

Its natural habitats are subtropical or tropical moist lowland forests and subtropical or tropical moist montane forests. It is threatened by habitat loss.
