= Laúca Hydroelectric Power Station =

Power station in Angola

Lauca Dam
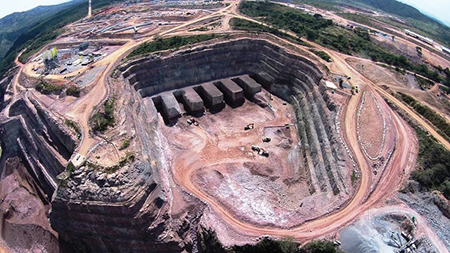

- Location within Angola
- Country: Angola
- Location: Dombo-Ya-Pepe, Malanje Province
- Coordinates: 09°44′22″S 15°07′33″E
- Purpose: Power
- Status: Operational
- Construction began: 2012
- Opening date: December 2020
- Construction cost: US$4.3 billion
- Owners: Angola Ministry of Water and Energy

Dam and spillways
- Type of dam: Gravity, roller-compacted concrete
- Impounds: Cuanza River
- Height: 132 m (433 ft)
- Length: 1,075 m (3,527 ft)
- Dam volume: 2,750,000 m^{3} (3,600,000 cu yd)
- Spillway capacity: 10,020 m^{3}/s (354,000 cu ft/s)

Reservoir
- Total capacity: 5,482,000,000 m^{3} (4,444,000 acre⋅ft)
- Surface area: 188 km^{2} (73 mi^{2})

Power Station
- Commission date: 4 August 2017
- Type: Conventional
- Hydraulic head: Main plant: 200 m (660 ft); Ancillary: 128 m (420 ft)
- Turbines: Main plant: 6 x 338 MW Francis-type; Ancillary: 1 x 42 MW Francis-type
- Installed capacity: Main plant: 2,028 MW; Ancillary: 42 MW; Total: 2070 MW
- Annual generation: 8,640 GWh

The Laúca Hydroelectric Power Station is a 2,070 MW (2,775,916 hp) hydroelectric power plant in Angola. It is the largest power station in the country.

== Location ==
The power station sits across the Kwanza River at the border between Angola's Cuanza Norte Province and Malanje Province. The Laúca Power Station, is located approximately 47 kilometres (29 mi) downstream of the Capanda Hydroelectric Power Station. This is approximately 280 kilometres (174 mi) by road, southeast of Luanda, the capital and largest city in the country. The geographical coordinates of Laúca Hydroelectric Power Station are:09°44'22.0"S, 15°07'33.0"E (Latitude:-9.739444; Longitude:15.125833).

== Overview ==
Construction of the biggest hydroelectric power installation in Angola began in 2012. The first 338 megawatts generator of the 2,070 megawatts power station was commissioned on 4 August 2017, when the power plant was officially inaugurated by President José Eduardo dos Santos, the president of Angola at that time. In July 2019, the fifth turbine, out of six main generating units, was installed. The last turbine (70 MW), came online in September 2023.

The power generated is integrated into the national electricity grid and supplies energy to approximately 8,000,000 customers in Angola. The project has provided over 8,000 direct jobs during the construction phase.

== Technical specifications ==
The 132 m (433 ft) tall roller-compacted concrete dam will withhold a reservoir of 5,482,000,000 m^{3} (1.936×10^{11} ft^{3}), with a surface area of 188 square kilometres (46,000 acres).

The reservoir will supply two hydroelectric power stations, a main and an ancillary. The main will contain six 338 MW Francis turbine-generators and the ancillary a single 42 MW Francis unit. The ancillary power station will operate most often, to maintain a minimum 60 m^{3}/s (2,100 cu ft/s) ecological flow of the river.

Later, the specifications were modified to six 334 megawatts generators for the main and one 70 megawatts generator for the ancillary.

== Funding ==
The dam and power station will cost US$4.3 billion. In the beginning the project received partial funding from the government of Brazil. Following a corruption scandal involving the government of Brazil in 2016, that line of credit was terminated, leaving a funding gap. The government of Angola turned to commercial lenders in order to raise the necessary funding to complete the project. The table below illustrates the sources of funding for the Laúca Hydroelectric Power Station.

Laúca Hydroelectric Power Station Funding
Rank	Development Partner	Amount Funded	Purpose	Notes
1	Government of Brazil		Dam	Loan
2	Government of Angola		Dam and Transmission	Investment
3	Standard Chartered Bank	€247.8 million	Transmission	Loan
4	Development Bank of Southern Africa	$5 million	Dam	Loan
5	Standard Chartered Bank	€220.5 million	Dam	Loan
6	Gemcorp Capital	$150 million	Dam	Loan
	Total	US$4,300 million		

== See also ==
- List of power stations in Angola
