= Caraculo =

Town in south-central Angola

- Town
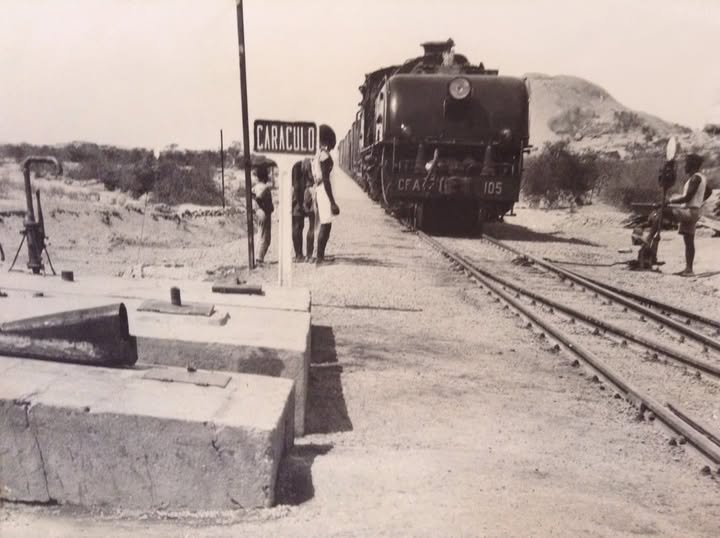
- Caraculo train station

- Location within Angola
- Coordinates: 15°1′51″S 12°39′42″E
- Country: Angola
- Province: Namibe
- Time zone: UTC+1:00 (WAT)

Caraculo (also known as Finlay) is a town in south-central Angola, in the province of Namibe.

== Transport ==
It is served by a station on the southern line of Angolan Railways (CFM). Near this town the railway has been deviated from its original alignment to avoid steep gradients.

In 2008, a concrete sleeper factory was being established at this town.

== See also ==
- Transport in Angola
