= Capanda Dam =

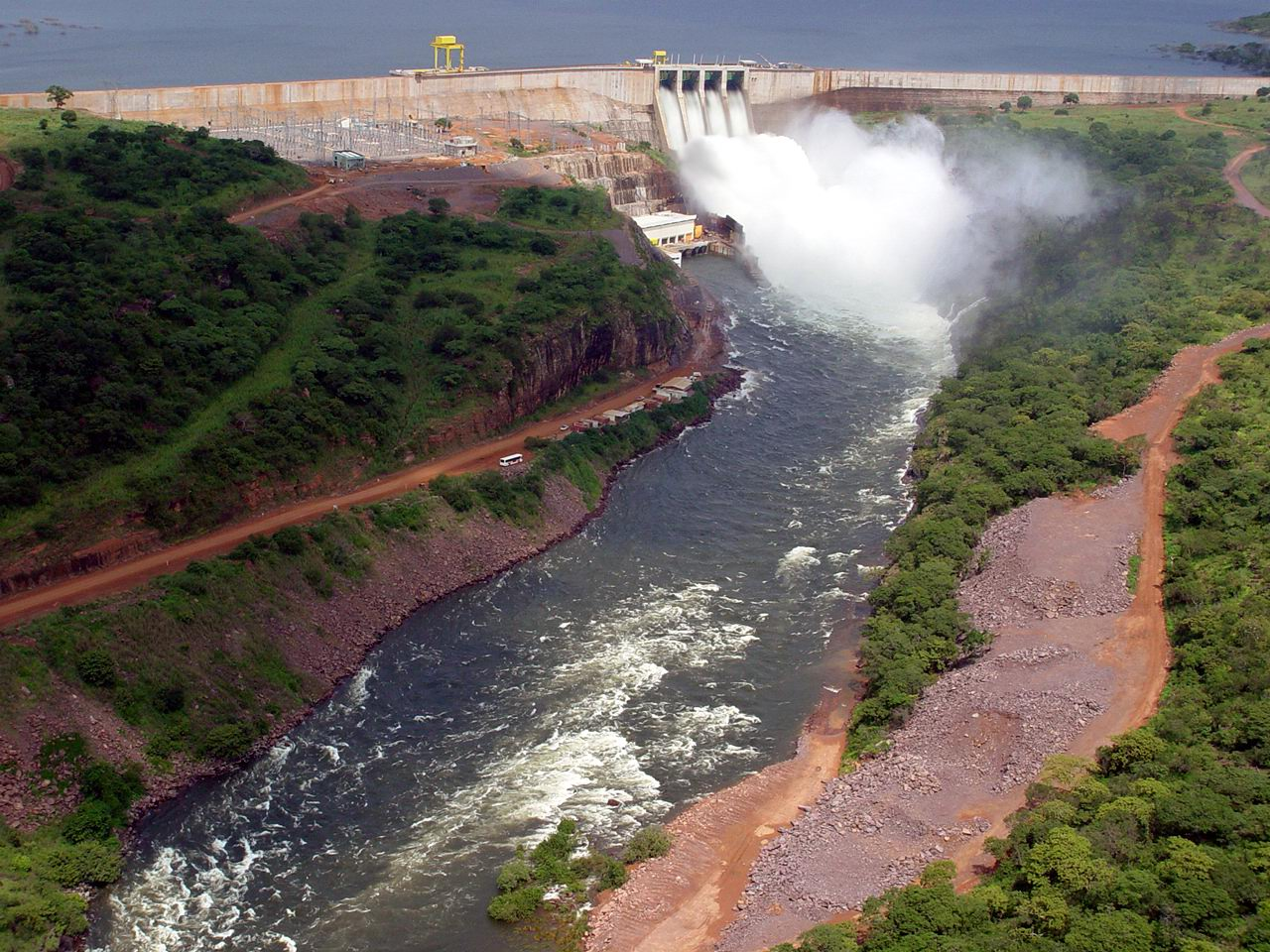
- Interactive map of Capanda Dam
- Location: Malanje, Angola
- Coordinates: 09°47′41″S 15°28′09″E
- Construction began: 1987
- Opening date: 2004
- Construction cost: US$4 billion
- Operator: Gamek

Dam and spillways
- Impounds: Kwanza River
- Height: 110 m (360 ft)
- Length: 1,470 m (4,820 ft)

Reservoir
- Surface area: 170 km^{2} (66 sq mi)

Power Station
- Commission date: 2004-2007
- Turbines: 4 × 130 MW (170,000 hp) MW Francis-type
- Installed capacity: 520 MW (700,000 hp)

The Capanda Dam is a hydroelectric dam on the Kwanza River in Malanje Province, Angola. Built in 1987–2007 by the Russian company Tekhnopromexport, general designer - the institute Hydroproject (Chief Engineer - Ph.D Fedosov V.E.) The facility generates power by utilizing four turbines and 130 megawatts (170,000 hp) each, totalling the installed capacity to 520 megawatts (700,000 hp) . Total cost of US$4 billion. An additional cost of more than US$400 million was spent in repairing the damage caused during UNITA's occupation of the area at the time of the Angolan Civil War in 1992 and 1999.

== The design ==
The principal structures include:

- concrete gravity dam, which includes: full section of the spillway dam, spillway bottom hydroelectric power plant,
- comprising: GES, four tunnel conduit,
- power house open switchgear (ORU 220 kW)
- administrative building

== Economic significance ==
As of 2013 Capanda HPP generates more than half of all electricity in Angola and is the largest hydroelectric complex in the country

== The history of construction ==
On September 2, 1982 Angola signed an intergovernmental Soviet-Angolan agreement for the framework contract, for the construction of a hydropower dam. The Ministry of Energy and Petroleum of Angola, formed a cabinet management group to manage construction for the Central Kwanza (GAMEK) contractor consortium of Capanda, which included the Soviet foreign trade association "Tekhnopromexport", and the Brazilian construction firm Odebrecht.

The first draft and the first topographic surveys on the alignment of the dam, were made in 1965 by the Portuguese COBA company. This project involved the construction of an arch dam, based on two gravity abutments. This project was scrapped by Soviet specialists and construction costs were later significantly reduced. Project Capanda HPP 520 MW was completed in 1989. The successfully project passed inspection by the state experts from the organizations of USSR, Angola and Brazil.

Construction began in January 1987. The Contract provided for the completion of the dam by the end of 1992. From April to October 1988, the construction of the tunnel excavation was completed. At the end of June 1989, the River Kwanzaa was blocked, and the water flowed into the tunnel. The filling of the reservoir was completed on September 1, 1992.

Construction of the dam was conducted under the conditions of the ongoing Civil War in Angola. On November 4, 1992, the site was captured by a UNITA military squad. During this attack about 20 Angolans - mostly police guarding the construction site and three Russian specialists were killed. After the capture of the unfinished hydro-electric site, it stood without any preservation or conservation until 2000. In 1997, an attempt was made to resume construction. During the reconnaissance survey on the upstream side of the dam, traces of powerful explosions were found. The crane towers were found thrown into the river. After UNITA left the area, the construction site was bare except for the remaining concrete dam wall. All residential barracks were burned, and all the new contract builders/engineers had to live in army tents for a while.

On February 12, 2000 work was resumed. In July 2002, work began to fill the reservoir. In January 2004 and June 2004, the first two turbines were brought online. Construction continued to the second stage, and in 2007, the third and fourth turbines were brought online. After UNITA left Capanda, all roads leading to the construction site were mined. Despite the fact that de-mining had been carried out, almost immediately after the resumption of construction, at least two large dump truck were destroyed by mines. Landmines were found on the construction site, and later, in places where the heavy rains had washed away soil. Mines in the area of Capanda are a hazard and are still being found today.

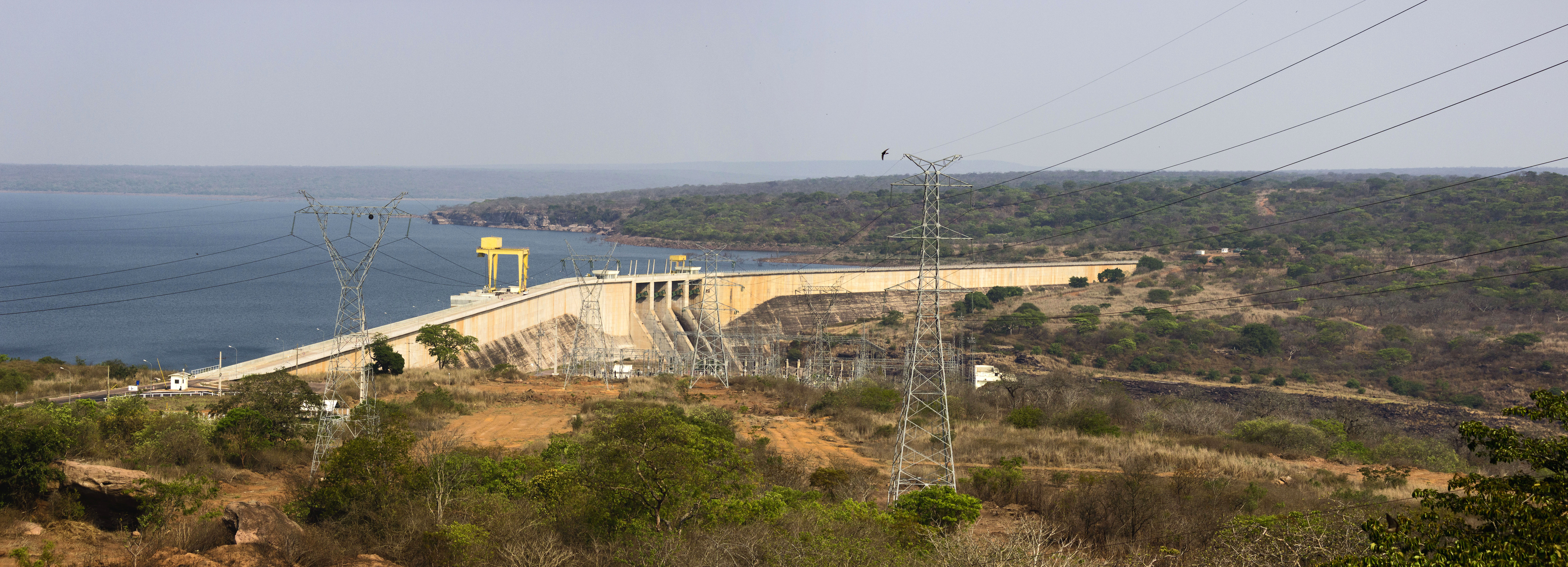
Panorama HPP Capanda from the right Bank

== See also ==
- List of power stations in Angola
