= Cuanza River =

River in Angola

Cuanza Kwanza, Quanza, Coanza
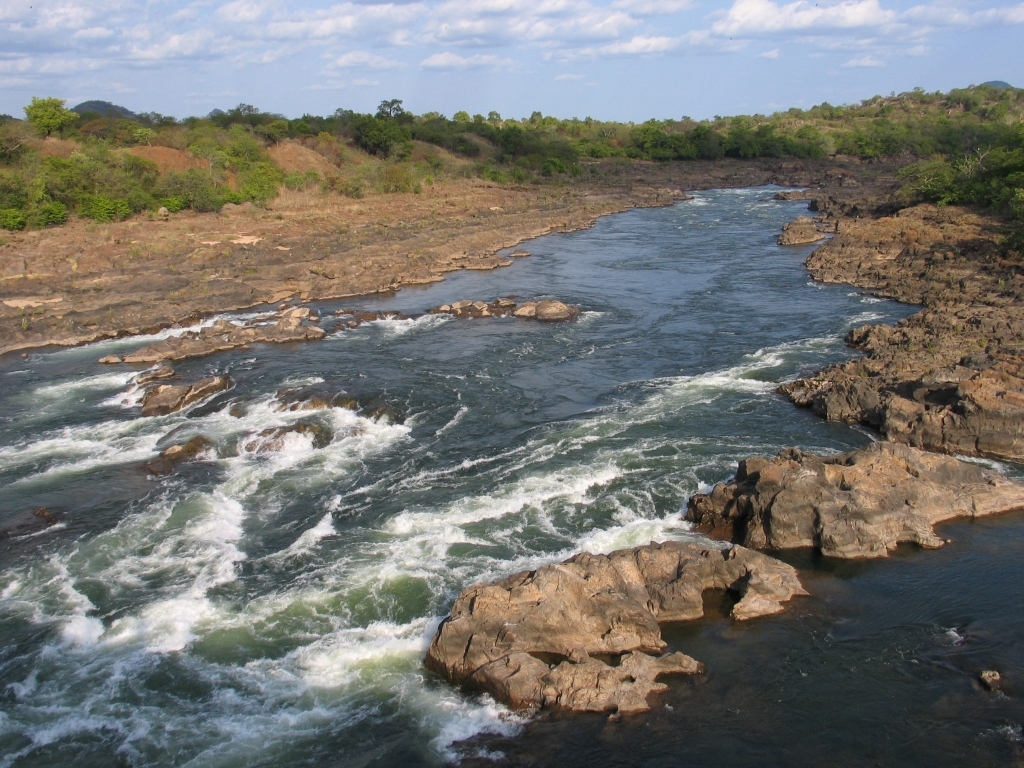

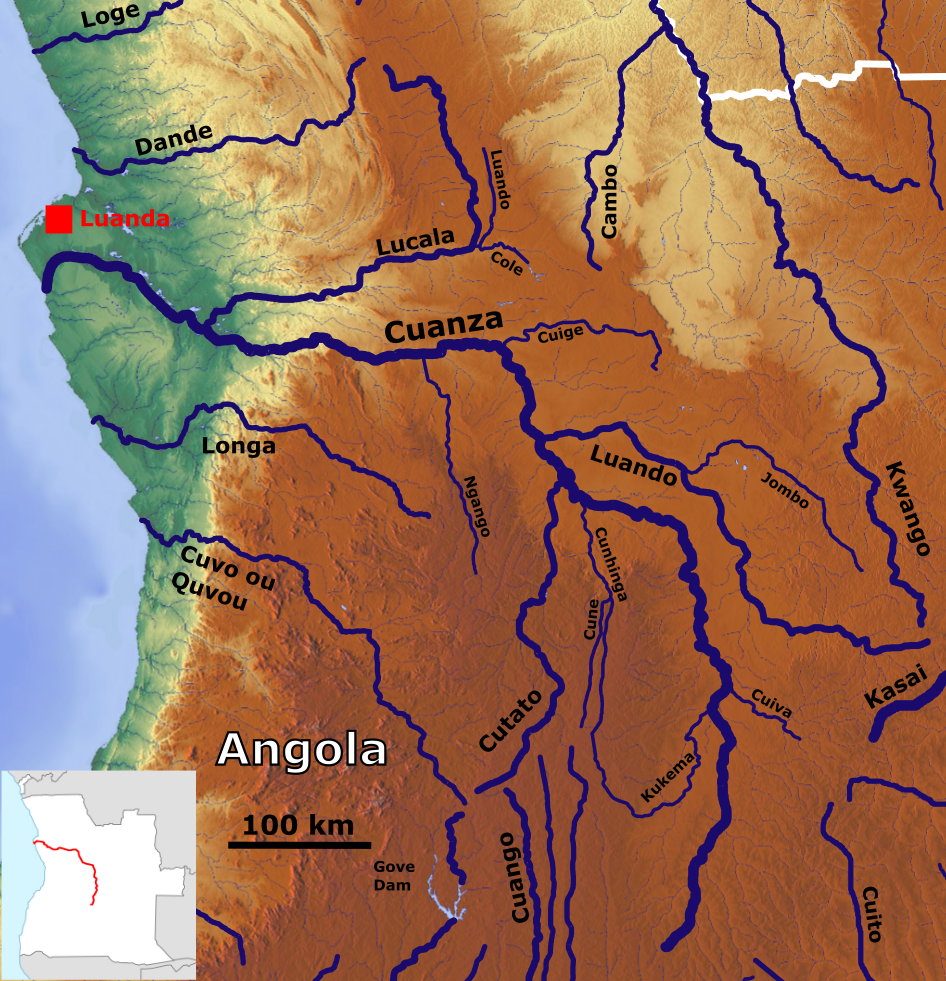
- Cuanza River and tributaries

Location
- Country: Angola

Physical characteristics
- Source: Bié Plateau
  - location: Central Angola
  - elevation: 1,234 m (4,049 ft)
- Mouth: Atlantic Ocean
  - location: 60 km (37 mi) south of Luanda
  - coordinates: 9°21′S 13°9′E
- Length: 960 km (600 mi)
- Basin size: 152,570 km^{2} (58,910 mi^{2})
- Discharge
  - location: Near mouth
  - average: (Period: 1971–2000)1,944.3 m^{3}/s (68,660 cu ft/s)

Basin features
- River system: Cuanza River
- Tributaries
  - left: Kukema, Cunhinga, Ngango, Cutato
  - right: Cuiva, Luando, Cuige, Lucala
- Waterbodies: Cambambe reservoir

The Cuanza River, also known as the Kwanza, the Quanza, or the Coanza, is the longest river in Angola. It empties into the Atlantic Ocean just south of the national capital Luanda.

== Geography ==
The river is navigable for about 150 miles (240 km) from its mouth, located 60 kilometers (37 mi) south of Luanda. Its tributaries include the Cutato and Lucala.

== History ==
The river's navigable lower course was the original route of the Portuguese invasion of northern Angola.

The Capanda Dam in Malanje Province was finished in 2004, providing hydroelectric power to the region and assisting in its irrigation. The Cambambe Dam and the Lauca Dam were also constructed on the river. The Caculo Cabaça Dam is under construction with estimated completion in 2024. The Barra do Kwanza, the mouth of the river, is gradually being developed for tourism, including a golf course.

The Church of Nossa Senhora da Victoria stands near the banks of the Cuanza River in Massanganu, Province of Cuanza-Norte, Angola.

== Wildlife ==
Rich biodiversity has been found in the Angolan river, according to research reported on the Science and Development Network website. Angola's first biodiversity tally of the Cuanza River has so far found 50 fish species. Researchers from the National Fishing Research Institute and the South African Institute for Aquatic Biodiversity say genetic testing may reveal new species. Sportfishing includes tarpon.

== Legacy ==
Angola's currency, the kwanza, is named after the river. The river is also the namesake of the provinces of Cuanza Norte ("Cuanza North") and Cuanza Sul ("Cuanza South").

== See also ==
- Quissama National Park, to the south of the river
