= Empresa Nacional de Electricidade de Angola =

State-owned electricity company

Empresa Nacional de Electricidade de Angola (E.N.E.) was a state-owned electricity company of Angola. It managed the national transmission network and operated more than 80 per cent of the country's generation facilities and of the distribution system outside Luanda. The company was closed in 2014 per presidential decree no. 305/14.

The decree created three new companies instead, i.e. Empresa Nacional de Distribuição de Electricidade (ENDE), Empresa Pública de Produção de Electricidade (PRODEL-EP), and Empresa Rede Nacional de Transporte de Electricidade (RNT-EP).
