= Fundação Mariusz Dowbor =

Mariusz Dowbor Foundation Fundação Mariusz Dowbor
- Fundação Mariusz Dowbor
- Logo of the Mariusz Dowbor Foundation
- Formation: December 8, 2023 (activities begun); May 16, 2025 (legal incorporation)
- Type: Non-profit, philanthropic foundation
- Headquarters: Luanda, Angola
- Region served: Angola
- Founding President: Tomasz Dowbor and Wojciech Dowbor
- Chair of the Board: Suzete Antão
- Website: fmdowbor.co.ao

The Fundação Mariusz Dowbor (English: Mariusz Dowbor Foundation, FMD) is an Angolan non-profit, public utility philanthropic institution headquartered in Luanda. Established in 2023 by businessmen Tomasz Dowbor and Wojciech Dowbor, it was legally incorporated through a decree issued by the President of Angola, João Lourenço, and published in the official gazette, Diário da República (3rd Series, No. 89, page 5735). The organization operates in the fields of social work, education, healthcare, and culture. Its primary financier is the Angolan conglomerate Grupo Boavida, with the foundation serving as the entity responsible for managing the group's private social investments.

== History and context ==
=== Patron ===
Mariusz Krzysztof Dowbor (Warsaw, December 8, 1937 – 2022) was a Polish-Angolan chemical engineer and businessman. A Warsaw University of Technology graduate in 1969, he settled in Angola in 1977 to participate in post-independence international cooperation projects. During this period, he established close ties with the MPLA during the nation's self-determination process, contributing significantly to economic diplomacy between Angola and Poland.

In the private sector, he founded Poltec, which eventually expanded into the real estate conglomerate Grupo Boavida (Cidade Boavida). In November 2025, the Angolan state recognized his historical contributions by posthumously awarding him the Medal of the Peace and Development Class (No. 168 on the official list of honorees celebrating the 50th anniversary of national independence) via President João Lourenço.

=== Establishment ===
The Mariusz Dowbor Foundation was instituted in December 2023, a year after the death of its patron. The entity was structured to centralize the corporate social responsibility strategy of Grupo Boavida, executing community development projects in education, healthcare, and socioeconomic integration.

The institution was officially granted legal status on May 16, 2025. Its legal personality and corporate bylaws were published in Angola's official gazette, the Diário da República (III Series, No. 89, page 5735).

== Areas of action ==
=== Education ===
The foundation operates the EJA Project (Youth and Adult Education), which targets literacy training for local community members and corporate employees. In professional insertion, the Boavida Conecta Project helps recent university graduates enter the labour market through specialized internships, supported by cooperation protocols signed with the Higher Institute of Administration and Finance (ISAF), IMETRO, the Higher Polytechnic Institute of Technologies and Sciences (INSUTEC), and the Private University of Angola (UPRA).

=== Health and community assistance ===
In the healthcare sector, the foundation's medical center provides outpatient consultations, laboratory testing, malaria and tuberculosis screenings, alongside the donation of essential medication. Humanitarian outreach initiatives routinely distribute food, drinking water, medicines, and clothing across vulnerable areas such as Quissama (Calamba), Barra do Cuanza, Muxima, Cabo Ledo, and Ramiros.

Additionally, the foundation provides continuous assistance to long-term shelter facilities and orphanages, including the Mamã Madalena Children's Home, Lar Kuzola, and Lar Beiral.

=== Inclusion and culture ===
Within its inclusion portfolio, FMD promotes the socioeconomic integration of individuals living with disabilities. In culture, it manages the preservation of the Dowbor family's artistic heritage and funds independent regional artistic groups. The foundation has funded literary works of historical significance, such as África, Cuito Cuanavale, Guerra e Paz na África Austral by journalist Amílcar Xavier.

Annually, the organization coordinates extensive cultural campaigns for International Children's Day, featuring book distributions and recreational programs. In 2024, it launched its Corporate Adoption initiative, structured to ease the transition of youth from institutional foster homes (such as Dom Bosco and Não há órfãos em Deus) directly into professional employment settings.

== See also ==
• People's Movement for the Liberation of Angola • Angola • Grupo Boavida
