= Visits by Pope Leo XIV to Algeria, Cameroon, Angola, and Equatorial Guinea =

2026 apostolic journey

Apostolic Journey to Algeria, Cameroon, Angola, and Equatorial Guinea
- Date: April 13–23, 2026
- Location: Algeria: Annaba: Basilica of Saint Augustine; Hippo Regius archaeological site; Little Sisters of the Poor care home; Algiers: Great Mosque of Algiers; El Mouradia Palace; Basilica of Our Lady of Africa; Augustinian Missionary Sisters center Cameroon: Yaoundé: Unity Presidential Palace; Ngul Zamba Orphanage; Episcopal Conference of Cameroon headquarters; Apostolic Nunciature; Yaoundé Nsimalen International Airport; Catholic University of Central Africa; Yaoundé-Ville Airport; Bamenda: Bamenda Airport; Saint Joseph's Cathedral; Archbishopric of Bamenda; Douala: Douala International Airport; Japoma Stadium; Catholic Hospital of Saint Paul Angola: Luanda: Quatro de Fevereiro Airport; Palácio de Ferro; Kilamba; Apostolic Nunciature; Our Lady of Fatima parish; Muxima: Church of Nossa Senhora da Conceição da Muxima; Saurimo: Saurimo Airport; Elderly nursing home; Our Lady of the Assumption Cathedral Equatorial Guinea: Malabo: Malabo International Airport; Archbishopric; St. Elizabeth's Cathedral; National University of Equatorial Guinea; Jean-Pierre Olie Psychiatric Hospital; Estadio de Malabo; Mongomo: Mongomo International Airport; Basilica of the Immaculate Conception; Papa Francesco Formation Center; Diocese of Mongomo; Bata: Bata Airport; Bata Prison; St. James and Our Lady of the Pillar Cathedral; Memorial monument for 2021 Bata explosions; Estadio de Bata

Pope Leo XIV visited Algeria, Cameroon, Angola, and Equatorial Guinea from April 13 to 23, 2026. This trip was this pope's third trip outside of Italy and first to Africa since his election in May 2025. The Holy See released the Pope's itinerary and transcripts of his addresses publicly in March.

== Background ==
=== Algeria ===
This was the first ever papal visit to Algeria in the history of the Catholic Church and the first leg of Pope Leo XIV's apostolic trip to Africa. Algeria is an overwhelmingly Muslim country, with 99% of the population being Sunnis, with only over 8,000 Catholics. Algeria is the homeland of Saint Augustine, who was the Bishop of Hippo and died in what is now modern-day Annaba. Pope Leo XIV is part of the Augustinian Order, who follow the teachings of St. Augustine. He also visited the Great Mosque of Algiers, one of the largest mosques in the world and the second he will visit, as a gesture of interfaith dialogue. The trip also aimed to provide support to local Catholic and Christian communities following a period of regional tension and church closures.

Prior to his election as Pope, Father Robert Prevost visited Algeria twice in his capacity as Prior General of the Order of Saint Augustine, which he held from 2001 to 2013. As a "spiritual son" of St. Augustine, these visits were connected to the historical and spiritual roots of his religious order. His first visit was in 2001 where he traveled to Annaba to attend an international conference on St. Augustine, and took place following the Black Decade of the Algerian Civil War. He returned to Algeria in 2013 at the conclusion of his twelve-year term for the formal reopening and dedication of the Basilica of St. Augustine following extensive restoration work. The project was a major collaboration involving the Algerian government, the French government, and the Augustinians. He also spent time with Augustinian friars who maintains the basilica and the Augustinian Missionary Sisters in Algiers.

=== Cameroon ===
Catholics make up nearly 33% of Cameroon's population, with origins tied to the French colonial era. Cameroon has hosted several papal visits, with Pope John Paul II visiting in 1985 and 1995, and Pope Benedict XVI visiting in 2009. Pope Leo XIV visited Yaoundé, Bamenda, and Douala during his three days in the country.

Pope Leo XIV's visit to Cameroon was highly anticipated as it intersected with the country's Anglophone Crisis, in which the Catholic Church serves as a mediator.

Archbishop Andrew Nkea Fuanya, who worked with Pope Leo XIV during the Synod on Synodality in October 2024, was instrumental in organizing the Pope's visit to Cameroon as President of the country's National Episcopal Conference. Nkea has campaigned for peace between the separatist Ambazonian movement in the South West Region and the Cameroonian government.

To honor Pope Leo's visit, some Ambazonian militant groups announced a temporary ceasefire in Cameroon, the first after nearly a decade of conflict, to allow "safe travel passage" for the Pope and pilgrims.

=== Angola ===
As a country formerly colonized by Portugal, Angola has a long history of Catholicism. Portuguese missionaries baptized King Nzinga a Nkuwu of the Kingdom of Kongo in 1491, giving him the baptismal name of João I. His son, Afonso I, became a devout Catholic and turned the kingdom into a Christian state. Afonso's son, Henrique Kinu a Mvemba, was a Catholic prelate and was appointed as the titular bishop of Utica, in present-day Tunisia as the first Central African bishop in history. The early Catholic Church in Angola established schools and churches to blend European liturgy with local traditions. In the early 1700s, as Catholic traditions declined due to a lack of clergy, syncretic folk movements developed out of the Catholic Church in Kongo, challenging the authority of the Church but without denying the Pope's authority. Under the Estado Novo dictatorship of António de Oliveira Salazar in the 1900s, the Catholic Church was granted authority over all indigenous education and was tasked with "civilizing" Angolans and spreading the Portuguese language. Following Angola gaining independence in 1975, the ruling government declared Angola an atheist state, which led to the religious restrictions and harassment of priests and nuns. By the late 1980s, admist the Angolan Civil War, the Church became the primary mediator for peace. Since then, the Catholic Church has been the most influential non-state institution in Angola, frequently criticizing government corruption and advocating for human rights.

Angola has hosted two popes on previous papal visits: Pope John Paul II in 1992 and Pope Benedict XVI in 2009. With approximately 40-50% of Angolans identifying as Catholic, Angola is a strategic hub for the Catholic Church in Africa. Pope Leo's visit is intended to promote hope, reconciliation, and peace amid significant corruption and poor human rights records.

=== Equatorial Guinea ===
Equatorial Guinea is a predominantly Catholic country, with at least 70% of the population identifying as such. Due to a history of Portuguese and Spanish colonization, the Catholic presence began in the late 15th century and strengthened in the 18th century. In 1853, Spain and the Vatican signed a concordat to establish Catholicism as the colony's official religion, leading to the expulsion of Protestant missionaries. The Claretians arrived in 1882 and became the dominant religious force, making Equatorial Guinea the country with the highest percentage of Catholics in Africa by the 1960s. After gaining independence from Spain in 1968, the then-Republic of Equatorial Guinean dictator Francisco Macías Nguema replaced Christianity with a personality cult, ordering his portrait to be displayed in every church, with phrases such as "There is no other God other than Macías Nguema". As a result of the total ban in 1978, many priests and nuns were arrested, killed, or forced into exile, fleeing to Gabon or Cameroon. After Macías Nguema was overthrown in 1979, his nephew Teodoro Obiang Nguema Mbasogo took over and also lifted the ban on the Church.

Equatorial Guinea has hosted one papal visit prior to Pope Leo's trip, with Pope John Paul II visiting in 1982 in a symbolic reopening of the Church after years of prosecution. The Catholic Church operates under the main Archdiocese of Malabo, with several suffragan dioceses throughout the country. As there are few Equatorial Guinea priests, most pastoral work is carried out by Spanish priests, monks, and nuns. While Equatorial Guinea is a secular state with freedom of religion, Catholicism has a privileged status with Masses integrated into major state ceremonies and national holidays.

== Itinerary ==
=== Algeria ===
While approaching Algerian airspace on April 13, the papal plane was given a military escort, which the Pope praised as "a sign of the goodness... generosity... respect that the Algerian people and the Algerian government have wished to show towards the Holy See, to myself". He landed at Houari Boumediene Airport in the capital city Algiers and was welcome by Algerian president Abdelmadjid Tebboune, during which a young girl offered him flowers. After the national anthems and presentation of the delegations, he was driven to the El Mouradia Palace where he was received in the Salon d'Honneur for a formal state meeting. Following the diplomatic reception, he was driven to the Maqam Echahid monument and then transitioned to an interreligious engagement at the Great Mosque of Algiers, the largest mosque in Algeria and the third-largest in the world. He met with the mosque's rector and other religious leaders. In the afternoon, Pope Leo visited the Basilica of Our Lady of Africa and held a meeting with the local Catholic community in the Archdiocese of Algiers. In his address, he offered encouragement to the small minority of Catholics in the country. He then visited a hospitality center managed by the Augustinian Missionary Sisters in the Bab El Oued neighborhood to emphasize the "works of mercy", focusing on the sisters' efforts to provide friendship and support to those in need regardless of faith. At the visit with the Augustinian sisters, Pope Leo also honored the memory of two Spanish nuns, sisters Esther and Caridad, who were martyred on the way to a chapel in 1994 during the Algerian Civil War. Pope Leo ended the day with a private evening.

On April 14, he made the journey to Annaba, the modern city that was once Hippo Regius. As an Augustinian, the Pope described this portion as a "spiritual homecoming" focusing on the legacy of St. Augustine as a bridge for modern interreligious dialogue, as St. Augustine is part of the Algerian identity. Pope Leo held silent prayer under a rainstorm at the archaeological site of the Basilica Pacis, where St. Augustine preached as Bishop, and laid a wreath of flowers and planted an olive tree in a symbolic gesture of peace. The Pope also listened a composition of hymns performed by a choir from Annaba's Music Institute featuring lyrics derived from St. Augustine's writings on peace and fraternity. Rev. Kevin Farrell, the current head of the Augustinian Order, accompanied Pope Leo during this visit. After the tour, Pope Leo visited the Ma Maison care home for the elderly, operated by the Little Sisters of the Poor. He met with the community's Mother superior and several residents, offering a message of hope. He notably thanked an elderly Algerian Muslim resident for his testimony on fraternal living. In the afternoon, he held a public Mass at the Basilica of Saint Augustine, where he praised the local Christian community for their perseverance. He also referenced his earlier visits in 2001 and 2013, expressing gratitude for the "divine plan" that allowed him to return as the successor of Peter. Ecumenical guests at the service included Bishop Ashley Null of the Anglican Diocese of North Africa. The Pope returned to Algiers in the evening to prepare for his departure to Cameroon the following morning.

=== Cameroon ===
On April 15, the Pope landed at Yaoundé Nsimalen International Airport in the afternoon and was welcomed by prime minister Joseph Dion Ngute. Two children offered a floral tribute to him. Following the national anthems and presentation of delegations, the Pope was transferred to the Unity Presidential Palace in Yaoundé. Here, he was received by president Paul Biya and Cabinet Director Samuel Ayolo. At 17:05 local time, Pope Leo met with local authorities, civil societies, and the diplomatic corps, where he delivered his address. He described Cameroon as "Africa in miniature" due to its richness in lands, cultures, languages, and traditions. The Pope also referenced Pope John Paul II and Pope Benedict XVI's visits, emphasizing the "importance of reconciliation, justice and peace". He also decried "a handful of tyrants" and urged the Cameroonian government to root out corruption. He called for peace in the Far North, Northwest, and Southwest regions that are afflicted by Anglophone Crisis conflict. Pope Leo also calls for a transition in Cameroon to prioritize civil societies, trade unions, and humanitarian NGOs. Afterwards, Pope Leo visited the Ngul Zamba Orphanage, operated by the Congregation of the Daughters of Mary. The Superior General of the orphanage welcomed him and the orphanage's children gave testimonies and sang welcome songs. At the end of the visit, the congregation, along with Pope Leo, recited the Lord's Prayer and he gave a Blessing. He was then transferred to the national headquarters of Cameroon's Episcopal Conference for a private meeting with the Cameroonian bishops. He then transferred to the Apostolic Nunciature for an evening meeting.

The following day, on April 16, Pope Leo was transferred to Yaoundé Nsimalen International Airport where he boarded a flight to Bamenda Airport, landing at 10:40 local time. He was received by local leaders and was transferred to Saint Joseph's Cathedral in Bamenda. At this time, he was accompanied by Archbishop Andrew Nkea Fuanya. At the cathedral, the choir sang an entrance hymn and gave a performance, followed by several testimonies from local Catholics. During his address, Pope Leo commended their testimonies and praised locals for their lives despite difficulties. He praised local religious leaders for establishing a Movement for Peace and called for similar movements globally. He especially named lay people and religious sisters, particularly those who have experienced violence, while condemning the "masters of war" for "killing and devastation" and robbing the local communities of resources and land. Afterwards, the Pope released seven doves as a sign of peace before leaving the Cathedral. He then went to have lunch with the Archbishop.

After leaving the archbishopric, Pope Leo returned to Bamenda Airport and held Holy Mass, delivering his homily to at least 20,000 attendees. In his homily, the Pope praised the local Church for their "signs of [their] trusting surrender to God, of [their] unshakeable hope and of [their] clinging, with all [their] strength..." He pointed out the "numerous forms of poverty" in the country, as well as "moral, social, and political corruption", citing "serious problems affecting the education and health-care systems, as well as large-scale migration to foreign countries". He called for Cameroon's moment to change and transform the country, warning that when difficult situations persist, people can fall into hopelessness, but "the word of the Lord... brings about transformation and healing". He then flew back to Yaoundé to rest for the night. Upon his return, Pope Leo met with a group of 12 representatives from Islamic communities, some of whom he received in December 2025. The Pope personally greeted each individual and listened to their words, before the group discussed collaborative projects to promote social justice and cooperation in the country.

On April 17, Pope Leo traveled to Yaoundé Airport where he then flew to Douala International Airport and was received by local authorities. He then transferred to Japoma Stadium for Holy Mass to celebrate the Eucharistic celebration of the second week of Easter. The mass was attended by at least 120,000 people. During his homily, the Pope noted the richness of Cameroon's natural resources in contrast with the material poverty of its citizens. He called for Cameroonians to "reject every form of abuse or violence" and reminded them that "[their] treasure lies in [their] values: faith, family, hospitality, and work". At the end of the Mass, Archbishop Samuel Kleda of the Archdiocese of Douala addressed words of thanks to the Holy Father. He returned to the sacristy to rest, then transferred to Catholic Hospital of Saint Paul, where he was received by the hospital's director for a private visit with some patients. His visit highlighted the Church's role in Cameroon's national health sector while he offered prayers and emphasized the dignity of the sick and the importance of accessible healthcare.

Afterwards, Pope Leo flew back to Yaoundé, where he then met with students and staff at the Catholic University of Central Africa, where he was received by the university's Rector Magnificus for the welcome hymn and musical interludes. During his address, he complimented the university as "a center of excellence for research" and emphasized that universities are especially important in this age. He ended his time in Cameroon at a farewell Mass at Yaoundé-Ville Airport for Seventh Sunday, also known as the Feast of Our Lady, Queen of the Apostles. In his homily, Pope Leo thanked Cameroonians for welcoming him and reassured them that Jesus does not abandon His disciples. He recalled the history of the Church throughout the ages, noting that "[it] has navigated many storms and strong winds". The Mass ended with words of thanks from Archbishop Jean Mbarga. He then returned to Yaoundé Nsimalen International Airport to depart for Angola via the papal plane.

=== Angola ===
During the flight to Angola, Pope Leo sent telegrams to the presidents of Equatorial Guinea, Gabon, and the Republic of the Congo as the papal plane flew over their countries. The papal plane arrived at Quatro de Fevereiro Airport in Luanda on at 15:00 local time on April 18. On the flight, the Pope was interviewed by journalists where he clarified that his speeches and homilies were drafted several weeks in advance, and are not intended to debate anyone. Upon arrival, he was welcomed and received by president João Lourenço. The delegations then transferred to the presidential palace for a private meeting in the Gabinete do Presidente. They then moved to the Salão Nobre for a gift exchange. Afterwards the Pope and the president Lourenço went to the Protocol Pavilion to meet with federal authorities, civil leaders, and the Diplomatic Corps. In his address to Angolan authorities, the Holy Father offered prayers for the victims of the recent heavy rains and floods in Benguela Province earlier that week. He described the resilient joy of the African people as a "political virtue" and a "reservoir of hope" that resists resignation and tyranny. Citing Pope Francis, he urged leaders to face conflict head-on rather than ignoring it, and encouraged the government to embrace diversity and prioritize the common good over partisan interests. Pope Leo also warns against a materialistic civilization that commodifies life and land, and called for an end to the "cycle of interests" where foreign and local powers take from the land. Finally, Pope Leo reaffirmed the Catholic Church's commitment to advocating for a model of life free of elitism.

The following morning on April 19, Pope Leo held a Mass in Kilamba, a suburb of Luanda, starting with words of thanks from Archbishop Filomeno do Nascimento Vieira Dias. In the audience were missionary priests from Uruguay and Poland who have lived in Angola for many years, as well as missionary doctors and pilgrims. In his homily, he drew a parallel between Jesus' Road to Emmaus journey and the modern history of Angola, observing that the Angolan people have often felt disheartened by the trauma of the civil war, poverty, and social division. The Pope outlined a path for the nation's renewal, urging the faithful to remain vigilant against superstitious or "magical" elements, instead renewing their commitment to the Eucharist. After the Mass and celebration, Pope Leo transferred to the Church of Our Lady of Muxima, where he led the rosary prayer at the Marian shrine. As his visit was during Easter season, the Pope emphasized the Resurrection of Jesus and encouraged people to look to Mary as a model, as "a mother loves all her children", thus the faithful should all love one another. He then returned to the Apostolic Nunciature to rest for the night.

On April 20, Pope Leo flew to Saurimo Airport in Saurimo, landing at 9:16 local time. Upon arrival, he was greeted by local leaders and then transferred to a nursing home for the elderly who have been abandoned by their families, some due to superstitious beliefs and accusations of witchcraft. The director of the nursing home and a Ministry of Health representative greeted him and accompanied him to meet the residents and staff. The director, Georgina Mwandumba, described the papal visit as a "blessing from Heaven", noting that the preparations for the visit led to infrastructure improvements in the city, including establishing stable electricity and water systems, establishing a permanent chapel on-site, and the publicity for Angola society to promote family reconciliation. After receiving testimonies from locals and exchanging gifts, the Pope made a brief visit to the Our Lady of the Assumption Cathedral. After that, he transferred to the esplanade in Saurimo where he held Holy Mass. In his homily, the Pope emphasized the importance of seeking Christ with genuine faith rather than out of self-interest or superstition. He also addressed contemporary social issues, lamenting how corruption leads to hoarding of resources by a select few. In the afternoon, Pope Leo transferred back to Saurimo Airport where he greeted local leaders then departed for Luanda. Upon arrival back in Luanda, the Pope met with religious leaders and pastoral workers at the Our Lady of Fatima parish. He then returned to the Apostolic Nunciature to rest before departing for Equatorial Guinea in the morning.

During the Pope's time in Angola, Father Samir Alrafayne, a Sudanese priest serving in the Archdiocese of Luanda called for global attention toward the ongoing humanitarian and refugee crisis amid the Sudanese civil war. Fr. Alrafayne highlighted that the world's attention is often focused on other conflict zones, leaving Sudan largely overlooked. He emphasized the Holy Father's plea for "no more war".

On April 21, the Holy Father celebrated Holy Mass in private at the Apostolic Nunciature and then transferred to Luanda International Airport for departure from Angola. At the airport, he was welcomed by president João Lourenço, who presented the national anthems, the passage of the Guard of Honour, and farewells of the respective delegations. He departed Angola at 9:19 local time.

=== Equatorial Guinea ===
After departing Angola, Pope Leo fielded interview questions from Angolan media agencies, in which he was questioned about the growth of the Catholic Church in the country and its need for a Cardinal. The Pope promised that the appointment of a Cardinal is in consideration for the future with a candidate that would also benefit Africa as a whole. He also touched on the expansion of the country's diocesan system to accommodate the growing number of parishioners.

The papal plane landed at Malabo International Airport at 11:31 local time, where he was welcomed by president Teodoro Nguema and his wife Constancia Mangue. Following the national anthems and the greetings of the respective delegations, the Pope and the Equatoguinean president transferred to the VIP hall for a brief private meeting. After that, the Pope transferred to the Presidential Palace for the courtesy visit in an open-top car. In the afternoon, Pope Leo met with local authorities, civil societies, and the diplomatic corps, alongside businesspeople and religious leaders. In his address to those present, he emphasized the intersection of faith, ethics, and political responsibility. He referenced The City of God, a book written by St. Augustine, and encouraged Equatoguinean officials to use it as a guide when building their new capital city Ciudad de la Paz. While referencing Pope Francis's work, Pope Leo warned against an "economy of exclusion" where the potential of AI and social networks are widespread but millions are left without basic necessities. After giving the address, Pope Leo transferred to the archbishopric for lunch. On the way, he had a brief visit at the St. Elizabeth's Cathedral for prayer and adoration of the Blessed Sacrament.

In the afternoon, Pope Leo arrived at the newly established National University of Equatorial Guinea's León XIV Campus, where he was greeted by the university rector and Malabo's archbishop Juan Nsue Edjang Mayé. The university unveiled a bust dedicated to his honor at the campus courtyard. He then attended a ceremony in front of the university's main entrance. Among those in the audience were the president of CICTE and the minister of education. The Holy Father delivered a speech to celebrate the inauguration of the new campus. Using the ceiba, Equatorial Guinea's national tree, as a metaphor, he spoke about the importance of rooting knowledge in truth and service rather than self-sufficiency or professional success. After concluding his time at the university, Pope Leo transferred to the Jean-Pierre Olie Psychiatric Hospital to meet with medical staff and patients to provide pastoral care. At the hospital, he was welcomed by the hospital director and deputy director, as well as patients and staff who performed a welcome song and dance. In the message to the assembly, Pope Leo expressed deep empathy for the "visible and invisible wounds" of the patients, and praised the facility for their work. He viewed an exhibition of artwork created by the patients and imparted a blessing on them before departing back to the archbishopric for a private meeting and dinner.

On April 22, the Holy Father departed for Malabo International Airport by car, where he took leave of local leaders. He departed Malabo bound for the city of Mongomo at 8:10 local time, and arrived at Mongomo International Airport at 9:10 local time, where he was welcomed by local authorities. He transferred to the Basilica of the Immaculate Conception, the largest religious building in Central Africa and the second largest Catholic church in all of Africa. At the basilica, the presided over Holy Mass and blessed the first stone of the future Cathedral of Ciudad de la Paz. In his homily, Pope Leo commemorated the 170th anniversary of the arrival of missionaries arriving in Equatorial Guinea. Citing Saint Paul VI, he tasked the congregation with carrying forward a faith that is firmly planted in African soil. A significant portion of the homily was focused on the practical application of faith in public life. He urged Equatoguineans to protect the poorest struggling families and those in prison, challenged them to bridge the gap between the privileged and the disadvantaged, and encouraged them to act as "builders of peace and reconciliation". Following the Eucharistic celebration, Pope Leo gifted the local community the chalice used during the liturgy and walked to the Papa Francesco Formation Centre, arriving at the site of the Technical School of Mines. He was welcomed by Bishop Juan Domingo-Beka Esono Ayang who unveiled a commemorative plaque of the visit, which Pope Leo then blessed. After the visit at the school and formation center, the Pope transferred to the diocese for a private lunch.

At 14:30 local time, the Holy Father departed to diocesan office to Mongomo Airport, where he departed to Bata Airport, landing at 15:40 local time. Upon his arrival, he was greeted by local authorities and departed to Bata Prison. He briefly visited the St. James and Our Lady of the Pillar Cathedral for prayer. After arriving at Bata Prison, Pope Leo was welcomed by the justice minister, the prison director, and the chaplain. Following a welcome hymn and introductory remarks, an inmate provided a personal testimony to the assembly. In his greeting to the people, Pope Leo characterizes the falling rain, as it was pouring during the visit, as a divine blessing to those in difficult circumstances. He emphasizes that no individual is ever excluded from God's love, asserting that human dignity remains intact regardless of past mistakes or personal suffering. The Holy Father encouraged inmates to view their time in prison as an opportunity for reflection, personal growth, and education, noting that a person's life is not defined solely by their mistakes. Additionally, he expressed gratitude to the prison staff for maintaining an environment of security and respect, which is essential for successful reintegration. After the visit to the prison, Pope Leo visited the memorial monument for the victims of the explosions in March 2021, stopping for silent prayer in the rain. He subsequently transferred to Estadio de Bata to address local youth and families. Despite heavy rain and heat, he urged those in attendance to be witnesses of charity and love. Addressing a crowd of approximately 50,000 people, the Holy Father urged the audience to act as active witnesses in their daily lives. He took time to affirm the testimonies of local Catholics, speaking to the unique "joys and challenges" inherent in their respective vocations. He called for a "firm resolution" to let the light of charity transform Equatoguinean social structures and institutions. At the end of the day, Pope Leo returned to Malabo for rest at the Apostolic Nunciature.

The following day on April 23, the Pope departed the Apostolic Nunciature to Estadio de Malabo for Holy Mass, where he first spent time greeting the faithful before beginning liturgical proceedings. In his homily, Pope Leo offered condolences for the late Fr. Fortunato Nsue Esono, the vicar general of the Archdiocese of Malabo, calling for clarity in the circumstances of his sudden death. He illustrated how faith serves as a guide for interpreting both Scripture and the "book of history" in one's own life. After the service, Pope Leo returned to Malabo International Airport to hold a farewell ceremony to conclude his Africa trip. At the airport, he was welcomed by president Nguema Mbasogo and his wife Constancia, whom welcomed Pope Leo to the country several days ago. After the national anthems and various formal exercises, Pope Leo boarded the papal plane and departed for Rome at 12:54 local time. The aircraft arrived at Rome Fiumicino Airport at 19:18 local time. During the flight, the Holy Father sent telegrams to the heads of state for Cameroon, Nigeria, Niger, Algeria, Tunisia, and Italy, thanking them for allowing the papal plane to pass through their airspaces, and sending his good wishes to their respective governments and people.

== Reactions ==
=== Visited countries ===
- (Algeria) Algerian bishops released a statement praising Pope Leo for his "fraternal presence" in a Muslim-majority nation. Local religious leaders praised his visit to the Great Mosque of Algiers as a significant step in Christian-Muslim harmony.
- (Angola) Angolan priest Fr. Inácio Kahamba noted the rarity of an outsider to speak so directly to officials, stating that "he knows that we are suffering."
- (Ambazonia) Prior to his arrival, Ambazonian separatist groups in western Cameroon declared a three-day ceasefire to ensure the Pope's safety.

=== International reactions ===
- (United States) Due to the Pope making statements about the war in Iran, U.S. president Donald Trump criticized Pope Leo as "terrible for foreign policy". Vice president JD Vance and speaker Mike Johnson also suggested the Pope should avoid weighing in on U.S. political matters.

=== Ecclesiastical officials and bodies ===
- Archbishop José Avelino Bettencourt, Apostolic Nuncio to Cameroon and Equatorial Guinea, celebrated the symbolism of Pope Leo immersing himself among the faithful and his persistent messages to those in power to respect the rights and dignity of their citizens.
- Bishop Juan Domingo Beka Esono Ayang, the President of the Episcopal Conference of Equatorial Guinea, described Pope Leo's visit as a "shared blessing" and a historic milestone for the country.
- Cardinal George Koovakad of the Syro-Malabar Church, the Prefect for the Dicastery for Interreligious Dialogue, praised Pope Leo's message of "universal fraternity" and his goal of reaffirming human dignity to build a world of peace.
- Cardinal Fridolin Ambongo Besungu, the Archbishop of Kinshasa in the Democratic Republic of the Congo and the President of the Symposium of Episcopal Conferences of Africa and Madagascar, described Pope Leo's words as "prophetic" and served as a necessary call to action for Africa political leaders.
- Archbishop Sarah Mullally of the Anglican Communion praised Pope Leo for speaking "powerfully about the many injustices" and thanked him for the "life and joy" his pilgrimage brought to Africa during a time of global suffering.

=== Third-party observers ===
- The Washington Post describes the apostolic journey as a significant shift in Pope Leo XIV's papacy and his image. Initially viewed as "reserved" compared to his predecessor, Leo has recently adopted a much more assertive and vocal role on the global stage, where he denounced "masters of war" and "tyrants". They regarded the trip as a platform for his activism against war as he reiterated a "culture of peace" and condemned the industry of war and neocolonialism.
- A spokesperson of the Catholic Relief Services expressed hope that the visit would encourage international donors to restore aid following recent cuts, saying that it put the region "back on the global humanitarian map".
