= N110 road (Angola) =

Road in Angola

N110 Road

Route information
- Maintained by Angola National Highways Authority
- Length: 605 km (376 mi)

Major junctions
- North end: Luanda
- South end: Xangongo

Location
- Country: Angola

Highway system
- Transport in Angola

The N110 Road is a national road in Angola connecting Luanda to Xangongo in the south. It's a north–south route that doesn't pass through any major cities besides Luanda and remains partially incomplete and unpaved in large sections.

== Route ==
=== Luanda Region ===
The N110 begins in eastern Luanda, branching off from the N100. It traverses the city passing through suburbs and marking the boundary between agricultural areas and the tropical rainforest to the east. In Catete, it intersects with the N230, and then continues south as a paved road, crossing the Cuanza River.

=== Southern Angola ===
Beyond Muxima, the N110 traverses a sparsely populated forest region, returning to the Cuanza River valley. However, the road's condition changes, becoming an unpaved dirt path that winds through the jungle. The terrain is relatively flat, with gentle hills and dense woodland.

The N110 resumes 55 kilometers south of Mumbondo, in Quilenda, as a paved road that stretches to Gabela, where it intersects with the N240. This section traverses the highlands, reaching elevations of approximately 1,000 meters, and runs parallel to a mountain ridge all the way to Uku. Beyond Uku, the road deteriorates into a dirt path, albeit a relatively easy one, for approximately 180 kilometers. The paved road recommences 25 kilometers north of Cubal, and from Cubal, the route merges with the N260, continuing eastward to Ganda on a paved surface.

South of Ganda, the N110 transitions to a dirt road for approximately 100 kilometers, leading to Caconda through mountainous terrain, with elevations reaching around 1,700 meters. Although slightly improved, this section remains a challenging dirt path. A brief asphalted stretch passes through the Caconda region, but the road reverts to a dirt path for an extended distance of nearly 350 kilometers, until just before Xangongo. Finally, the last segment connecting to the N105 and Xangongo is paved, providing a smoother finish to the journey.

== History ==
Despite originating in Luanda, the N110 has historically been less significant than other national roads connected to the capital. This is largely due to the absence of major cities along the route beyond Luanda. As of 2020–2021, substantial sections remained unpaved, including a 55-kilometer gap between Mumbondo and Quilenda. Only about 275 kilometers (25%) of the 1,100-kilometer route were asphalted in 2021.

The oldest paved section is likely the Luanda-Catete stretch, dating back to the 1990s or possibly the Portuguese colonial era. This was later extended to Muxima, where a permanent bridge over the Cuanza River was built around 2010. Additional paved sections include:

- Gabela to Uke (77 km, 2011–2012)
- Quilenda to Gabela (35 km, 2019)
- Caconda town (around 2010)
- Techiulo to Xangongo (30 km, 2013–2014)

Notably, an 880-meter bridge over the Cunene River at Xangongo was completed in 2009, after initial delays.
