= Ícolo e Bengo =

Icolo e Bengo
- Municipality
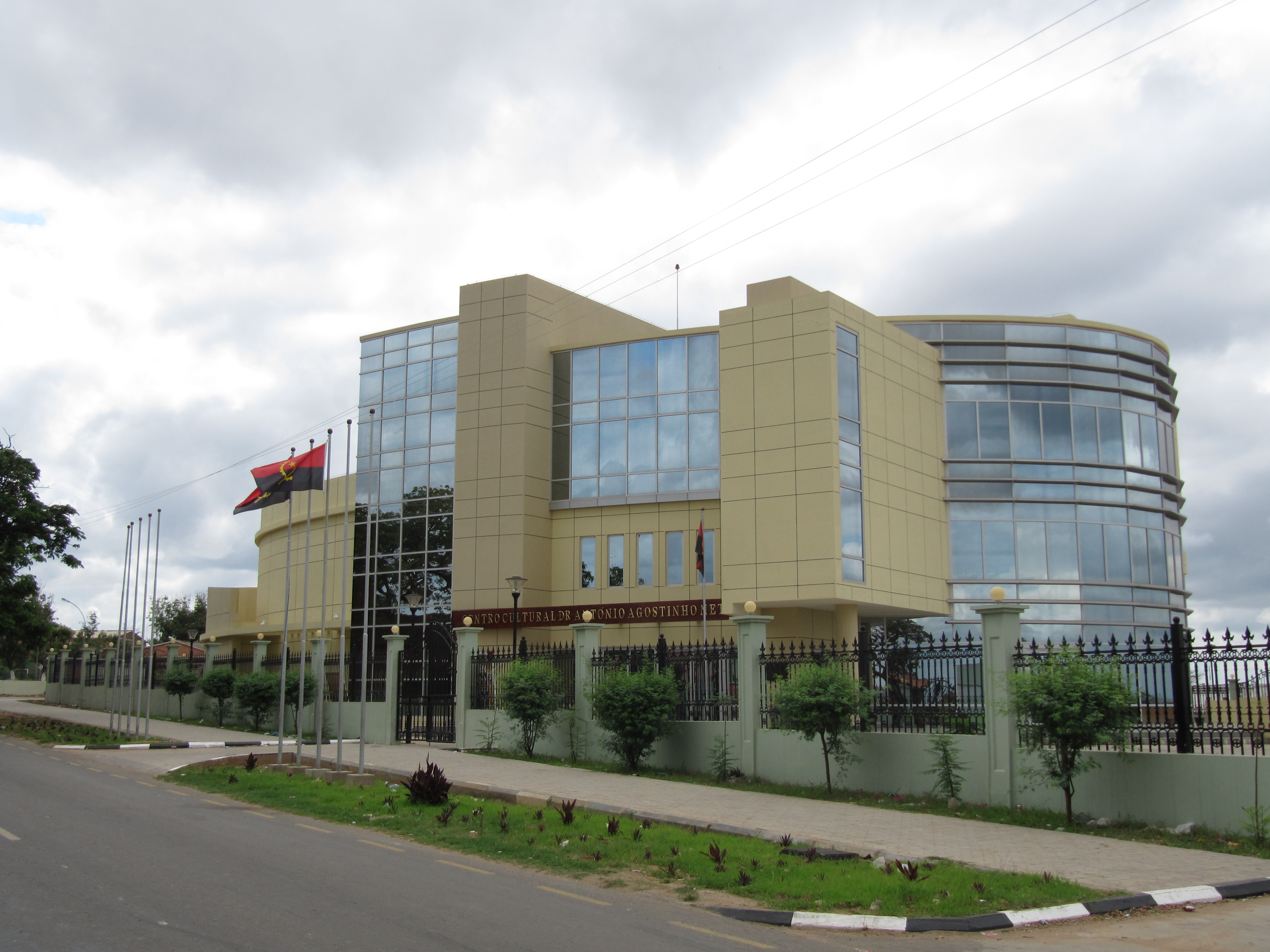
- Agostinho Neto Cultural Center in Catete

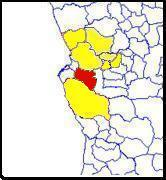
- Icolo e Bengo (red) in Bengo province (yellow)

- Location in Angola
- Coordinates: 09°15′S 013°44′E
- Country: Angola
- Province: Luanda

Area
  - Total: 3,059 km^{2} (1,181 sq mi)

Population (2014 Census)
  - Total: 81,144
  - Density: 43/km^{2} (110/sq mi)
- Time zone: UTC+1 (WAT)

Ícolo e Bengo (English: Icolo and Bengo) was a former municipality in the province of Luanda in Angola. It had a population of 81,144 in 2014. It was disestablished when the province of Icolo e Bengo was created in 2024.

== History ==
As per decree 29/11, of 1 September 2011, which moved this municipality, along with the municipality of Quiçama from Bengo Province to Luanda Province. The others being Luanda, Belas, Cazenga, Cacuaco, Viana and Quiçama. The transfer documents were signed on 2 April 2012 in Catete by the governors of Luanda Province, Bento Bento, and João Miranda, of Bengo Province, in the presence of the minister for territorial administration, Bornito de Sousa.

The municipality was disestablished when the new province of Icolo e Bengo was created on 5 September 2024.

== Geography ==
=== Overview ===
It covered an area of 3,059 square kilometres (1,181 sq mi) and its estimated population as of 2019 was 131,268.

Icolo e Bengo was bordered to the north and south respectively by the municipalities of Dande and Quiçama (in Bengo and Luanda provinces respectively), to the east by the municipality of Cambambe (Cuanza Norte province), and to the west by the municipalities of Viana and Cacuaco (both in Luanda province).

=== Administrative Division ===
The municipality, with the seat in Catete, was divided into five comunas (communes), as follows:

- Catete
- Bom Jesus
- Cabiri
- Caculo Cahango
- Calomboloca

== Personalities ==
- Agostinho Neto (1922–1979), 1st President of Angola
