= Samba, Luanda =

Urban district of Luanda, Angola

Samba
- Urban district
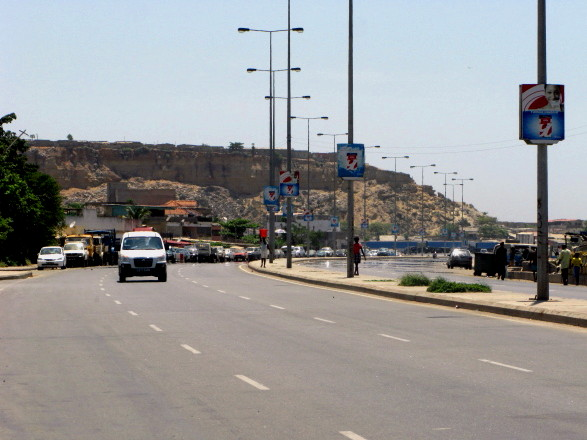
- Interactive map of Samba
- Coordinates: 8°50′12″S 13°13′33″E
- Country: Angola
- Province: Luanda
- Municipality: Luanda

Area
  - Total: 20.32 km^{2} (7.85 sq mi)

Population
  - Total: 364,986
  - Density: 17,960/km^{2} (46,520/sq mi)
- Time zone: UTC+1:00 (WAT)

Samba is one of the 17 municipalities that make up the Luanda Province, Angola. The municipality had a population of 364,986 in 2024.

== Orientation ==
Samba lies to the south of Ingombota along the coast of the Atlantic Ocean. The district is bordered to the north by Maianga, Quilamba Quiaxi to the east and the municipality of Viana, Angola also to the east.

== Neighborhoods ==
Samba is composed of seven neighborhoods: Rocha Pinto, Prenda, Gameque, Morro Bento, Mabunda, Samba, and Corimba.
