= Luanda Province =

Province of Angola

Coordinates: 8°48′55″S 13°13′59″E

Luanda
- Province
- Country: Angola
- Capital: Luanda

Government
  - Governor: Luis Manuel da Fonseca Nunes
  - Vice-Governor for the Economic Sector: Jorge Miguens Augusto
  - Vice-Governor for Technical Services and Infrastructures: Calunga Francisco Zage Quissanga
  - Vice-Governor for the Political and Social Sector: Manuel Antonio Goncalves

Area
  - Total: 1,645 km^{2} (635 sq mi)

Population (2024 census)
  - Total: 8,816,297
  - Density: 5,359/km^{2} (13,880/sq mi)
- ISO 3166 code: AO-LUA
- Website: www.luanda.gov.ao

Luanda is a province of Angola. It covers an area of 1,649 km^{2}, and has a population of approximately 8,665,510, according to the Census of 19 September 2024.

The city of Luanda is the capital of the province and Angola. It serves as the country's primary port, cultural and urban centre and occupies 44.8 square miles.

== History ==
Luanda Province until 2011

Luanda Province until 2024

The original prewar Luanda Province grew in size during the 20th century due to the urbanization of Angola. It was divided into the provinces of Luanda and Bengo in 1980.

The new reform of 2011 moved the municipalities Icolo e Bengo and Quiçama from Bengo to Luanda Province, so as the province has 3 neighboring ones instead of being surrounded by Bengo. This administrative reform significantly increased the land area of Luanda Province. It formerly had an area of 2,417 square kilometres (933 mi^{2}) and a reported population of 6,542,942 in 2014, before accounting for reorganization. In 2024, the province was reduced again.

== Governors ==
Governors of the Luanda Province have included: Francisca Espírito Santo (c. 2009–2010), Jose Maria dos Santos (c. 2011–2013), and Graciano Francisco Domingos (c. 2014).

== Administration ==
The province has created the Instituto de Planeamento e Gestão Urbana de Luanda (IPGUL, Institute for urban planning and management of Luanda) as an independent organ for urban planning of the province.

== Municipalities ==
The province of Luanda contains 16 municipalities (Portuguese: municípios):

Name	Area in km^{2}	Population Census 2014	Population Census 2024
Belas	614.3	309,229	381,861
Cacuaco	87.18	860,760	1,025,859
Camama	74.64	...	667,094
Cazenga	33.13	582,786	823,025
Hoji Ya Henda	25.34	309,615	642,050
Ingombota	14.57	103,260	144,911
Kilamba	419.2	...	493,593
Quilamba Quiaxi	51.52	841,411	1,120,781
Maianga	26.34	598,613	727,681
Mulenvos	70.97	...	882,014
Mussulo	43.03	7,798	15,283
Rangel	6.22	136,453	190,569
Samba	20.32	...	364,986
Sambizanga	4.71	...	177,808
Talatona	50.38	...	292,919
Viana	104.5	...	865,863
Totals	1,645	6,405,870	8,816,297

In 2011, Luanda Province was subdivided into seven municipalities, namely, Luanda, Belas, Cacuaco, Cazenga, Icolo e Bengo, Quiçama and Viana. In November 2016, another two municipalities were added, Talatona and Kilamba-Kiaxi respectively, giving the province 9 municipalities, 41 urban districts, and 14 communes. In 2025, both the province and the municipalities' limits were reformed.

== Communes ==
The province of Luanda contains the following communes (Portuguese: comunas); sorted by their respective municipalities:

- Belas Municipality: – Barra do Cuanza, Quilamba (Kilamba); Benfica e Mussulo, Ramiros
- Cacuaco Municipality: – Cacuaco, Funda, Quicolo (Kikolo)
- Cazenga Municipality: – Cazenga, Hoji Ya Henda, Tala Hady; Cazenga Popular, Distrito Industrial
- Ícolo e Bengo Municipality: – Bom Jesus do Cuanza, Cabiri (Kabiri), Caculo Cahango, Calomboloca (seat: Cassoneca), Catete
- Luanda Municipality: – Angola Quiluanje, Ingombota, Maianga, Rangel, Samba, Sambizanga
- Quiçama Municipality: – Cabo Ledo, Demba Chio, Mumbondo, Muxima, Quixinje (Kixinje)
- Viana Municipality: – Calumbo, Viana, Zango, Mbaia
- Kilamba-Kiaxi Municipality: – Quilamba-Quiaxi (Kilamba-Kiaxi); Golfe, Palanca, Sapú, Vila Estoril
- Talatona Municipality: – Benfica, Talatona; Camama, Futungo de Belas, Quificas

== List of governors of Luanda ==
Name	Years in office
Pedro Fortunato Luís Manuel	1976–1977
Afonso Van-Dunem Mbinda	1977–1978
Agostinho André Mendes de Carvalho	1979–1980
Francisco Romão de Oliveira e Silva	1980–1981
Evaristo Domingos Kimba	1981–1983
Mariano da Costa Garcia de Puku	1983–1986
Cristovão Francisco da Cunha	1986–1988
Luís Gonzaga Wawuty	1988–1991
Kundi Paihama	1991–1993
Rui Óscar de Carvalho	1993–1994
Justino José Fernandes	1994–1997
José Aníbal Lopes Rocha	1997–2002
Simão Mateus Paulo	2002–2004
Job Pedro Castelo Capapinha	2004–2008
Francisca do Espírito Santos	2008–2010
José Maria Ferraz dos Santos	2010–2011
Bento Joaquim Sebastião Francisco Bento	2012–2014
Graciano Francisco Domingos	2015–2016
Francisco Higino Lopes Carneiro	2016–2017
Adriano Mendes de Carvalho	2017–2019
Sérgio Luther Rescova Joaquim	2019–2020
Joana Lina	2020-2021
Ana Paula de Carvalho	2021-2022
Manuel Homem	2022-present

Up to 1991, the official name was Provincial Commissioner
