= Cassoneca =

- Commune
- Location in Angola
- Coordinates: 9°12′S 13°52′E
- Country: Angola
- Province: Icolo e Bengo
- Municipality: Catete
- Time zone: UTC+1 (WAT)

Cassoneca is a commune located in the municipality of Catete, the capital of the province of Icolo e Bengo in Angola. Prior to the creation of Icolo e Bengo in 2024, it had been located in the commune of Calomboloca in the municipality of Ícolo e Bengo in Luanda Province.
