= N105 road (Angola) =

Road in Angola

N105 Road

Route information
- Maintained by Angola National Highways Authority
- Length: 605 km (376 mi)

Major junctions
- North end: Benguela
- South end: Techiulo

Location
- Country: Angola

Highway system
- Transport in Angola

The N105 Road is a national road in Angola spanning 605 kilometers in the southern region. It forms a north–south route, connecting the cities of Benguela, Lubango, and Techiulo. The N105 serves as a transportation link in the southern part of the country, facilitating travel and trade between the key urban centers.

== Route ==
The N105 branches off from the N100 in the southern part of Benguela, initially traversing a coastal desert area before turning southeast into the highlands. The road ascends to approximately 800 meters above sea level, passing through Catengue, where the N260 diverges. The route to Lubango is likely fully paved. East of Lubango, the N105 is co-signed with the N280, passing through the city center and providing access to the airport. From Lubango, the N105 continues south-southeast, crossing the highlands at over 1,400 meters above sea level. The landscape features dry savannah with scattered vegetation, punctuated by small villages, though the area is relatively sparsely populated. The N105 terminates at the village of Techiulo, intersecting with the N110, near the regional town of Xangongo.

== History ==
The N105 holds significance in long-distance traffic, serving as the primary paved route from the coast to southern Angola, as the southern section of the N100 is not suitable for through traffic. Historically, the road was largely unpaved until after 2000. Between 2009 and 2011, a substantial stretch from near Benguela to near Lubango was asphalted, featuring a modern single-lane design accommodating higher speeds. The southern section from Lubango to Xangongo was initially paved before 2002 and underwent modernization around 2010, enhancing the overall road network in the region.
