= Rangel, Luanda =

Urban District of Luanda

Rangel
- Administrative Division of Luanda
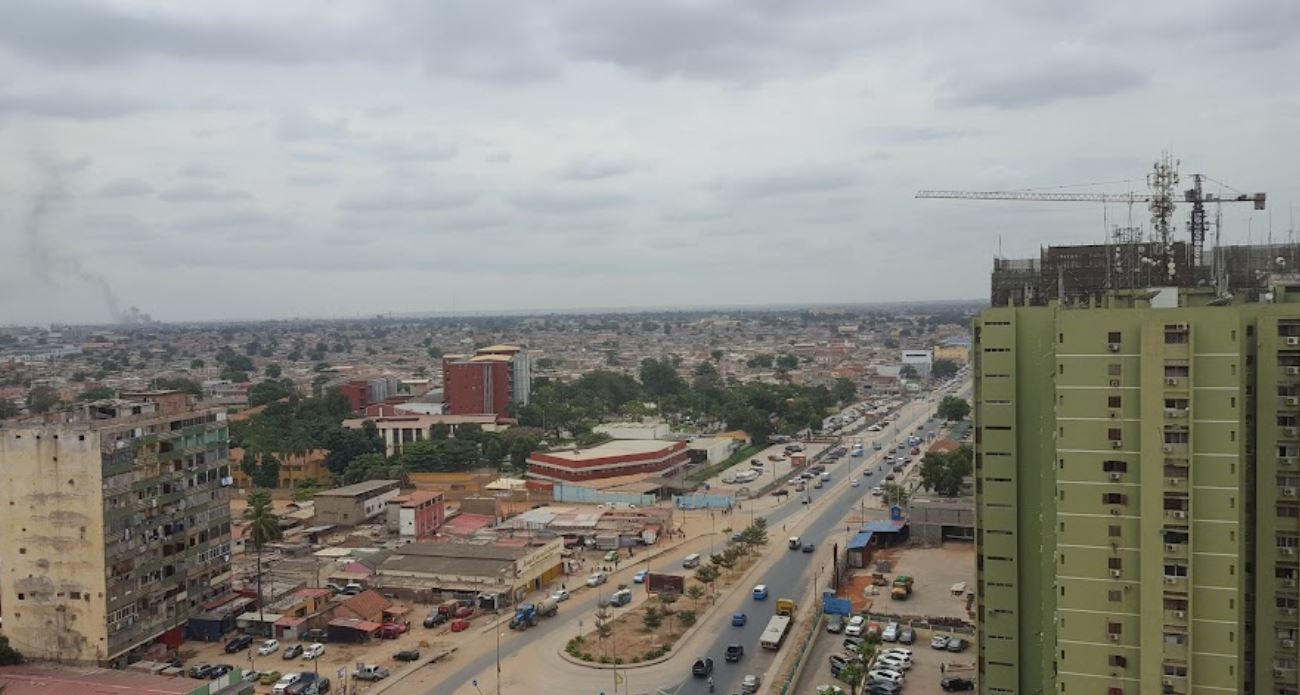
- View from Cidadela Towers over Avenue Hoji ya Henda
- Interactive map of Rangel
- Coordinates: 8°49′37″S 13°15′46″E
- Country: Angola
- Province: Luanda
- Founded: 1576

Area
  - Total: 6.2 km^{2} (2.4 sq mi)
- Elevation: 6 m (20 ft)

Population (2006)
  - Total: 261,000
  - Density: 42,000/km^{2} (110,000/sq mi)
- Time zone: +1
- HDI (2019): 0.697; Medium

Rangel is one of the six urban districts that make up the municipality of Luanda, in the province of Luanda, the capital of Angola. The Rangel District is one of the older and more urbanized in Metropolitan Luanda. The district has an area of 6.2 square kilometers. The district is best known as the home of Americo Boavida University Hospital as well as several large sporting facilities including Pavilhão da Cidadela, Pavilhão Anexo and Pavilhão Anexo II.

== Orientation ==
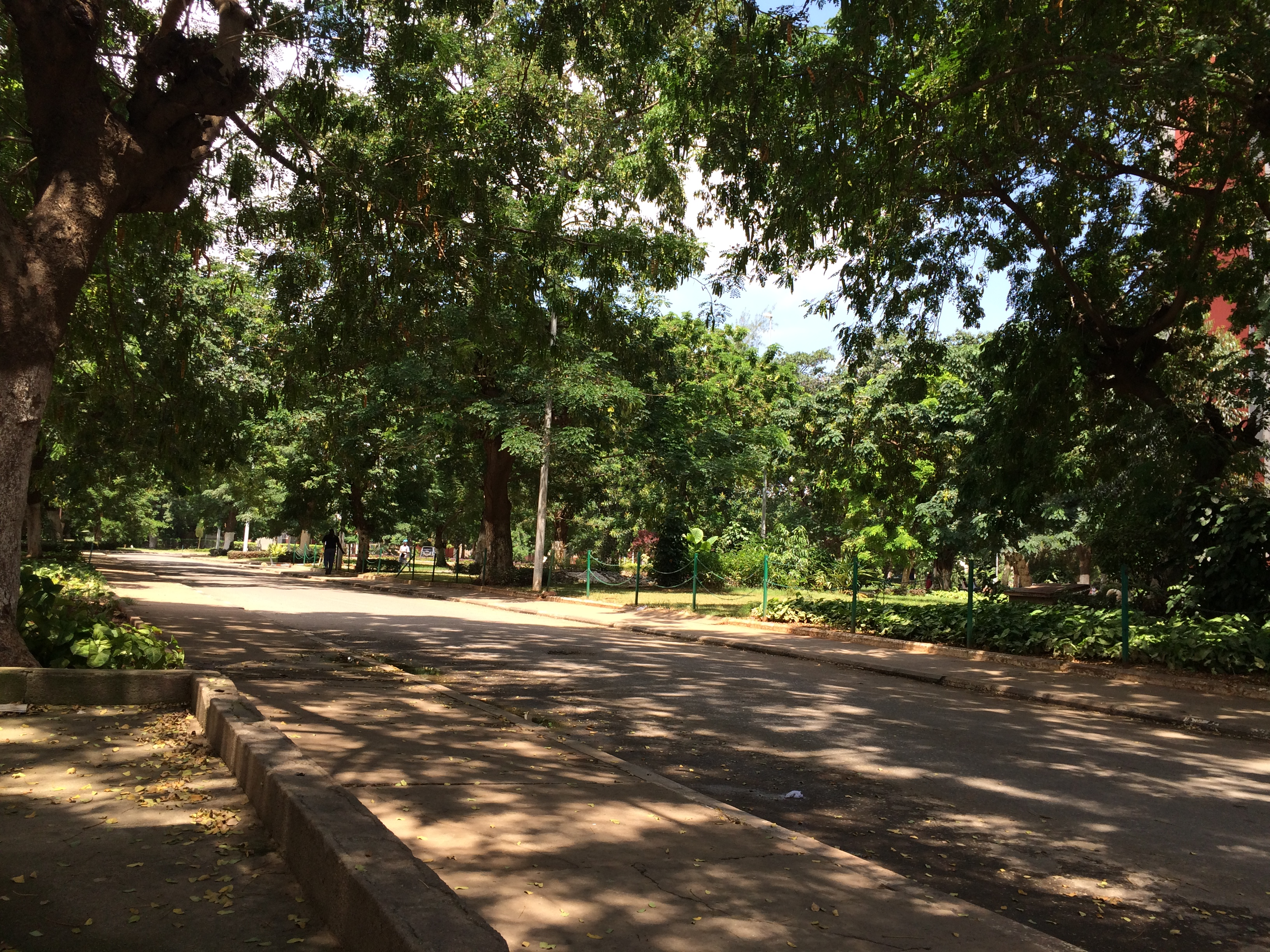
The Americo Boavida University Hospital campus in Rangel

At last count in 2006, Rangel was believed to have a population of 261,000. Rangel is bordered to the west by the municipalities of Ingombota, to the north by Sambizanga, to the east by Cazenga and the south by the municipalities Kilamba Kiaxi and Maianga. Rangel consists of 12 distinctive neighborhoods. Americo Boavida University Hospital is located in Rangel. The hospital was founded in 1958 and is an important teaching hospital and regional medical center for Luanda.

Avenue Deolinda Rodrigues runs along the southern border of Rangel and connects the Central Business District in Ingombota to the suburbs to the south and east of Luanda. Avenue Hoji ya Henda divides Rangel between its northern and southern sections. The southern section of Rangel is more formally built and is the home of several large sporting and medical institutions. The northern part of Rangel consists of informally built neighborhoods known as Musseques, a large waste treatment plant and the Telecommunications Institute of Angola. The northern border of Rangel is regarded as Avenue N'Gola Kiluanje.

In recent years a number of high-rise residential, hotel and office buildings have been constructed in the Vila Alice neighborhood on the western edge of the district.

== Neighborhoods ==
- Terra Nova
- Precol
- Combatentes
- Valódia
- Vila Alice
- Indígena
- Zangado
- Nelito Soares
- Saiotes
- Rangel Commission
- CTT
- Margal

== Transportation ==
Estação dos Musseques is located on the eastern edge of Rangel and is serviced by the Luanda Railway with service to the terminus Estação Central de Luanda and Estação da Filda to the east. Soba Mandume Street, Avenue Deolinda Rodrigues, Conego Manuel das Neves Street and Hoji ya Henda Street are the major avenues in the District.

== See also ==
- Railway stations in Angola
- Luanda
