= Quiçama =

- Municipality
- Location in Angola
- Coordinates: 09°31′S 013°58′E
- Country: Angola
- Province: Icolo e Bengo

Area
  - Total: 13,900 km^{2} (5,400 sq mi)

Population (2014 census)
  - Total: 26,546
  - Density: 3.37/km^{2} (8.7/sq mi)
- Time zone: UTC+1 (WAT)

Quiçama (Portuguese spelling), Quissama or Kisama (Bantu spelling) is a municipality in the province of Icolo e Bengo in Angola. Prior to the creation of Icolo e Bengo in 2024, it had been one of the nine municipalities that made up the province of Luanda. It covers an area of 13,900 square kilometres (5,400 sq mi) and its population as of 2014 is 26,546. The municipal seat is the village of Muxima.

Quiçama is bordered to the north by the municipalities of Viana and Icolo e Bengo, to the east by the municipalities of Cambambe, Libolo and Quibala, to the south by the municipalities of Quilenda and Porto Amboim, and to the west by the Atlantic Ocean.

Part of the municipality is occupied by the Quiçama National Park (Portuguese: Parque Nacional da Quiçama).

== History ==
In the 1580s Kafuxi ka Mbari was the recognized defender of this area. In the 1580s he and the Portuguese based out of Luanda asserted his authority here. In 1594 Francisco de Almeida with the support of Pedro Alvares Rebello waged warfare to remove Kafuxi ka Mbari from power. Kafuxi ka Mbari defeated the forces under Almeida.

== Administrative division ==
Quiçama is subdivided into the communes of Demba Chio, Mumbondo, Muxima, and Quixinge. Cabo Ledo was previously a commune in Quiçama, but it was promoted to the status of a separate municipality when the province of Icolo e Bengo was created.
