= Zango, Angola =

Zango
- Town
- Location in Angola
- Country: Angola
- Province: Icolo e Bengo
- Municipality: Calumbo

Area
  - Total: 146 km^{2} (56 sq mi)

Population (2014)
  - Total: 198,538
  - Density: 1,360/km^{2} (3,520/sq mi)
- Time zone: UTC+1 (WAT)

Zango is a town in the municipality of Calumbo in the province of Icolo e Bengo in Angola. Prior to the creation of that province in 2024, Zango was a commune in the municipality of Viana in Luanda Province. The town hosts many modern housing and industrial estates and borders the Dr. António Agostinho Neto International Airport.

== Geography ==
Zango is situated on the flat, clay-heavy coastal plains of the Greater Luanda basin. The town is bounded to the south and east by the lower Cuanza and Bengo River drainage zones. Because of its low-lying terrain and poor soil drainage, the area is prone to localized flash flooding during the wet season. The region experiences a hot semi-arid climate (Köppen BSh), heavily moderated by the cold Atlantic Benguela Current which keeps annual rainfall relatively low. Temperatures peak between 28°C and 32°C during the humid rainy months from October to April, followed by a cooler, overcast dry season known as the Cacimbo from May to September.

== History ==
Zango was an area of grazing lands, orchards, and small farms on the distant periphery of Luanda. In late 1990s, the Government of Angola initiated a mass social housing program to address severe urban congestion and housing shortages in Luanda. The area was primarily planned as a resettlement site for families displaced by heavy seasonal flooding in central Luanda's informal settlements known as squatting in Angola, as well as those affected by inner-city urban renewal projects.

The municipality was divided into sequential phases such as Zango 1 through Zango 4, and later Zango 8000. The project expanded rapidly over two decades and has since become one of the largest satellite urban developments in metropolitan Luanda. The area continues to attract development as a residential area, adding strain to local infrastructure. The municipality and most development grew off of Estrada Zango Calumbo south of the Fidel Castro Expressway, the primary north-south axis through the area.
