= Calomboloca =

- Village
- Location in Angola
- Coordinates: 9°09′S 13°50′E
- Country: Angola
- Province: Icolo e Bengo
- Municipality: Catete
- Commune: Cassoneca

Population (2014)
  - Total: 15,454
- Time zone: UTC+1 (WAT)

Calomboloca is a village in the commune of Cassoneca in the municipality of Catete, the capital of the province of Icolo e Bengo in Angola. It was formerly a commune in the municipality of Ícolo e Bengo in Luanda Province, but the commune was disestablished when the province of Icolo e Bengo was created in 2024.
