= Quilamba Quiaxi =

Municipality in Luanda Province, Angola

- Municipality
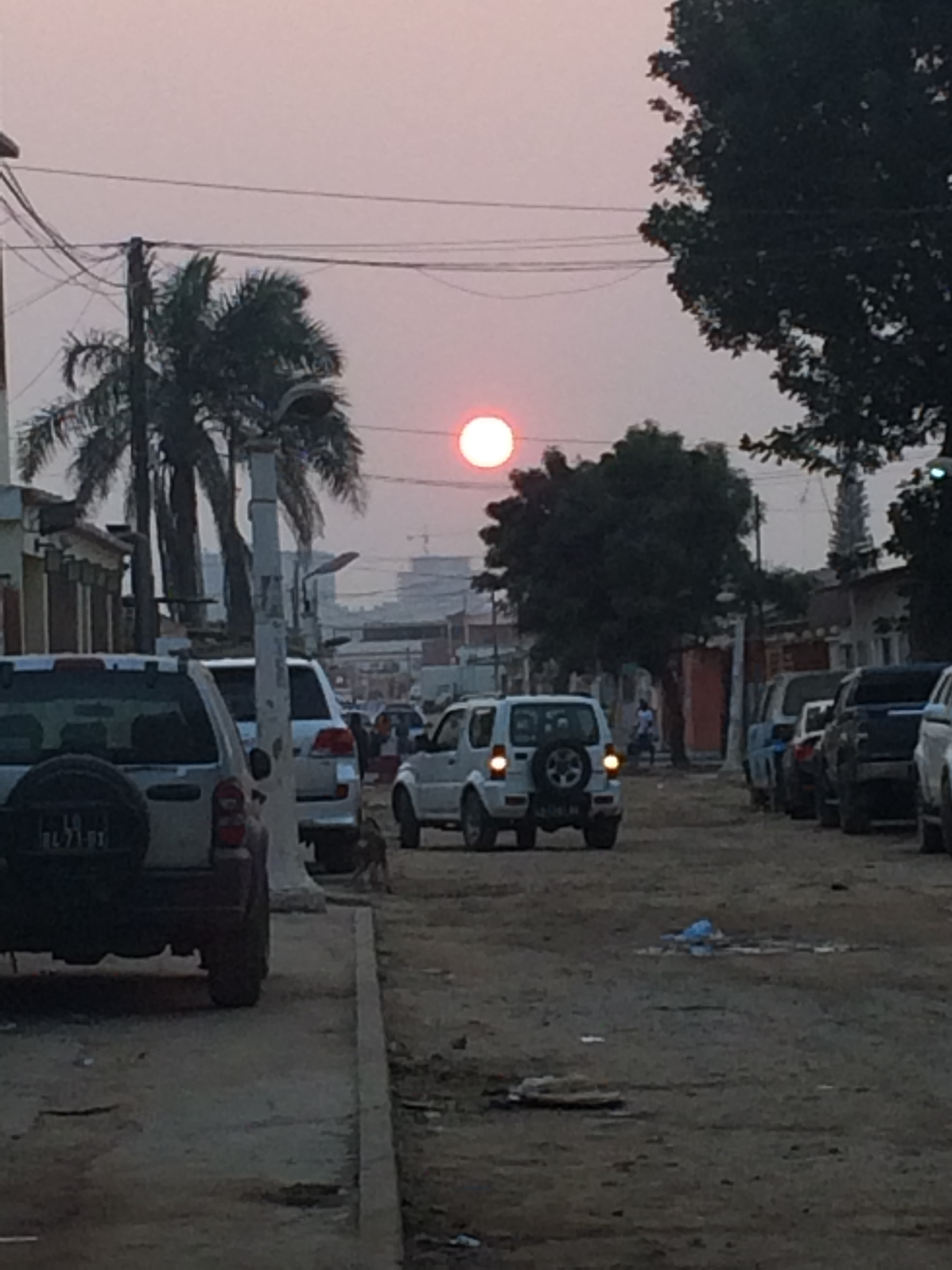
- Sunset over a street in Quilamba Quiaxi

- Location within Angola
- Coordinates: 8°50′55″S 13°16′30″E
- Country: Angola
- Province: Luanda

Area
  - Total: 51.2 km^{2} (19.8 sq mi)

Population (2022)
  - Total: 1,120,781
  - Density: 21,900/km^{2} (56,700/sq mi)
- Time zone: UTC+1:00 (WAT)

Quilamba Quiaxi, also spelled as Kilamba Kiaxi, is a city and one of nine municipalities that make up the province of Luanda in Angola. The name means Land (Kiaxi) of Kilamba in the Kimbundu language.

At the time of the 2024 population census by the National Institute of Statistics, it had a population of approximately 1,120,781 inhabitants and a territorial area of 51.5 km^{2}.

== Geography ==
It is bordered to the west by the urban district of Maianga, to the north by the urban district of Rangel and the municipality of Cazenga, to the east by the municipality of Viana, and to the south by the municipality of Talatona. It is the sole commune within the municipality, which is subdivided into the urban districts of Golfe, Golfe II, Palanca, Vila Estoril and Sapú.

In 2011, due to administrative reform, it was classified as an urban district, but in 2016 it regained the status of municipality.
