= Viana (commune) =

Viana is a commune, with a population of 1,382,854 (2014 census), located in the municipality of Viana in Luanda Province, Angola.
