= Caculo Cahango =

- Commune
- Location in Angola
- Coordinates: 9°18′S 14°4′E
- Country: Angola
- Province: Icolo e Bengo
- Municipality: Catete

Government
  - Mayor: Armando da Costa

Area
  - Total: 707 km^{2} (273 sq mi)

Population (2014)
  - Total: 6,988
  - Density: 9.88/km^{2} (25.6/sq mi)
- population of commune
- Time zone: UTC+1 (WAT)

Caculo Cahango (also spelled Kakulo Kahango, Kaculo Kahango and Kakulo-kanhango) is a commune in the municipality of Catete, the capital of the province of Icolo e Bengo in Angola. Prior to the creation of that province in 2024, it had been located in the municipality of Icolo e Bengo in Luanda Province.

The commune had 6,988 residents in 2014.
