= Church of Nossa Senhora do Rosario =

Church in Kuanza Norte province, Angola

Coordinates: 9.7425°S 14.4872°E

The Church of Nossa Senhora do Rosario (in Portuguese: Igreja da Nossa Senhora do Rosario) is located in Kuanza Norte province, Angola.

== History ==
This church is placed in Kambambe, Province of Kwanza Norte and it was built by order of the Governor Manuel Cerveira Pereira, in 1603. It is one of the most ancient churches, and its architectural conformation is similar to the Church of Muxima. It owned some slaves and was the religious local where the slaves were baptized with other names arising from the Factories (Feitorias) and from the captures made by the portugueses in the neighbour villages to be used as cheap man-power in the plantations and mines that the europeans had in american lands. It was classified as National Monument by the Provincial Decret n. 67, 30 of May of 1925. It is badly preserved. It is a state property and the responsibility for its maintenance and preservation concerns the Ministry of Culture.

== World Heritage Status ==
This site was added to the UNESCO World Heritage Tentative List on November 22, 1996, in the Cultural category.
