= Uanhenga Xitu =

Angolan writer and nationalist

Mendes de Carvalho

Provincial Commissioner of Luanda
- In office 1979–1980
- Preceded by: Afonso Van-Dunem Mbinda
- Succeeded by: Francisco Romão

Minister of Health
- In office 1980–1983
- Preceded by: Domingos Coelho da Cruz
- Succeeded by: António José Ferreira Neto

Personal details
- Born: August 29, 1924 Calomboloca, Icolo e Bengo, Angola
- Died: 13 February 2014 (aged 89) Luanda, Angola
- Party: MPLA

Agostinho André Mendes de Carvalho (August 29, 1924 – February 13, 2014), known by the pseudonym Uanhenga Xitu, was an Angolan writer and nationalist. Xitu was born in Calomboloca, and in 2009 was the oldest member of the parliament for the MPLA party.
