= Cabiri, Ícolo e Bengo =

Cabiri
- Municipality
- Location in Angola
- Coordinates: 08°54′55″S 13°40′09″E
- Country: Angola
- Province: Icolo e Bengo

Area
  - Total: 222 km^{2} (86 sq mi)

Population (2014)
  - Total: 17,551
  - Density: 79.1/km^{2} (205/sq mi)
- Time zone: UTC+1 (WAT)

Cabiri is a municipality in the province of Icolo e Bengo in Angola. Prior to the creation of Icolo e Bengo Province in 2024, it had been a commune in the municipality of Ícolo e Bengo in Luanda Province.

== Transport ==
It has a terminal station of a branch line of the Luanda Railway of the national railway system.

== See also ==
- Railway stations in Angola
