= Funda, Angola =

Commune in Angola

Funda
- Commune
- Location within Angola
- Coordinates: 08°50′31″S 13°33′07″E
- Country: Angola
- Province: Icolo e Bengo
- Municipality: Sequele

Population (2014)
  - Total: 209,387
- Time zone: UTC+1 (WAT)

Funda is a commune, with a population of 209,387 (2014), in the municipality of Sequele in Icolo e Bengo Province, Angola. Prior to the creation of Icolo e Bengo in 2024, it had been a commune in the municipality of Cacuaco in Luanda Province.

It is to the east of the capital city of Luanda.

== Transport ==
Funda is served by a station on a branch line of the Luanda Railway.

== See also ==
- Railway stations in Angola
