= Church of Nossa Senhora da Conceição da Muxima =

Church in Bengo Province, Angola

Church of Our Lady of Conception of Muxima
- Portuguese: Igreja da Nossa Senhora da Conceição da Muxima
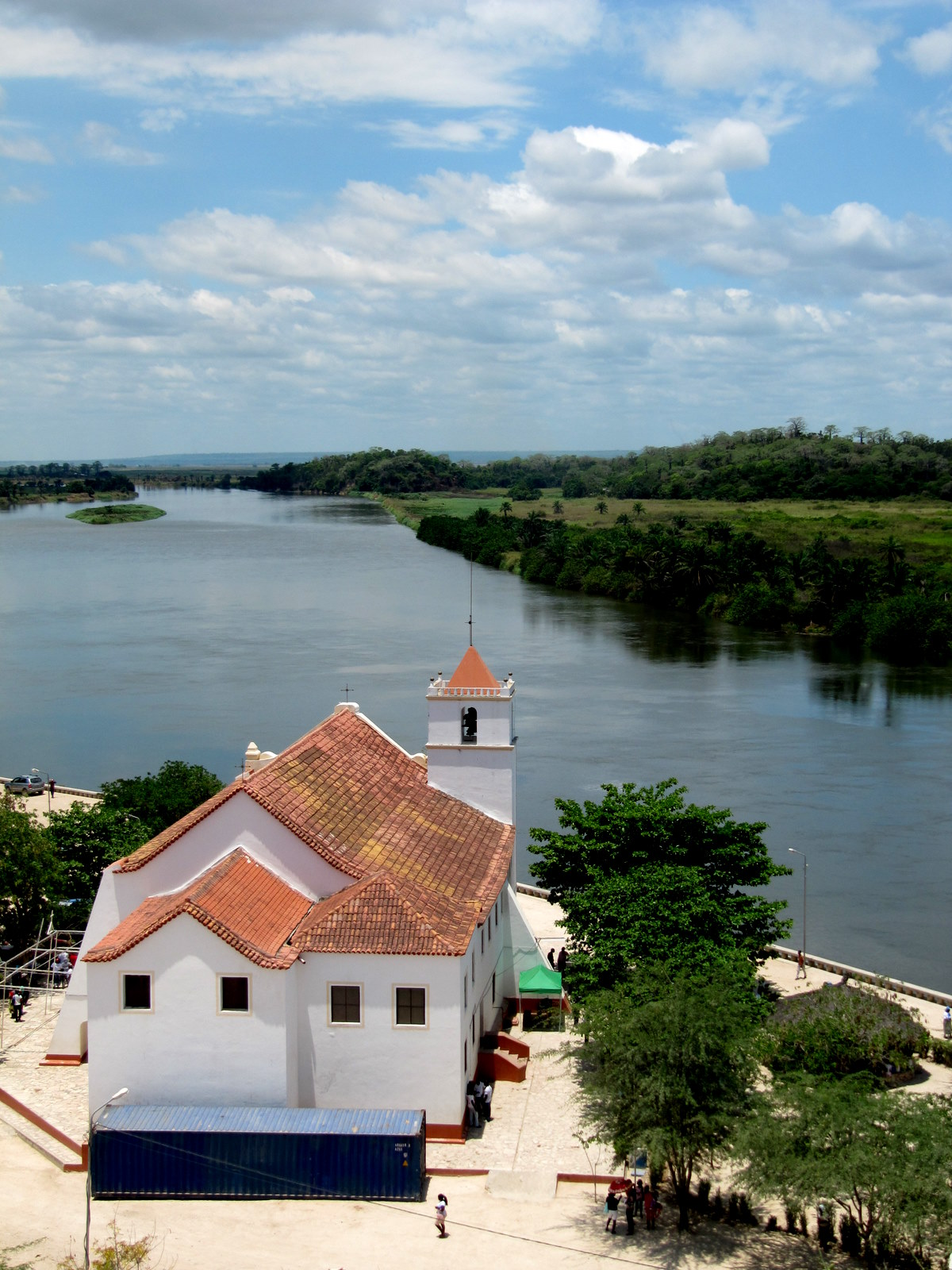
- The church from behind overlooking Kwanza River
- Church of Our Lady of Conception of Muxima
- 9.52067°S 13.959657°E
- Country: Angola
- Denomination: Roman Catholic Church

Architecture
- Style: Portuguese Colonial style
- Years built: 1599

The Church of Our Lady of Muxima (Portuguese: Igreja da Nossa Senhora da Conceição da Muxima) is a Marian shrine located in the Muxima District of Bengo Province, western Angola.

The 16th century Portuguese Colonial style church was an important center in the Portuguese slave trade in Angola.

== History ==
The church stands on the left bank of the Kwanza River and is a contemporary of the Fortress of Muxima. The village of Muxima was occupied by the Portuguese in 1589 and ten years later in 1599, the Fortress was founded and the church was built with a prayer invoking the intercession of Nossa Senhora da Muxima.

Muxima was an important center of the slave trade, protected by the Fortress, and the church played an important role as it is where slaves were baptized before being deported.

On 20 April 2026, the shrine received Pope Leo XIV during his African tour, and he prayed the rosary before the image of Our Lady of Muxima.

== Architecture ==
It is spacious and strong building, with a stern, typically Portuguese architecture, built above the Kwanza River. It was set on fire by the Dutch Republic in 1641, when they captured Muxima. Later, it was modified.

The shrine, with its image of the Blessed Virgin Mary, has been a place of great devotion for Christian pilgrims for generations.

It was classified as a National Monument by Portuguese Provincial Decree No. 2, on 12 January 1924. It is relatively in good order and belongs to the Roman Catholic Church, with responsibility for its maintenance and preservation belonging to the Angolan Ministry of Culture.

== World Heritage Status ==
This site was added to the UNESCO World Heritage Tentative List on November 22, 1996, in the Cultural category.

== See also ==
- Catholic Church in Angola
- Portuguese colonisation of Africa

== Notes ==
=== References ===
- Valdez, F. T. (1861), Six Years of a Traveller's Life in Western Africa, Vol. II, Hurst and Blackett.
- Church of Nossa Senhora da Conceiçào da Muxima - UNESCO World Heritage Centre
