= Fortress of Muxima =

Fort in Angola

Coordinates: 9°31′17.94″S 13°57′35.85″E

Fortress of Muxima Fortaleza de Muxima
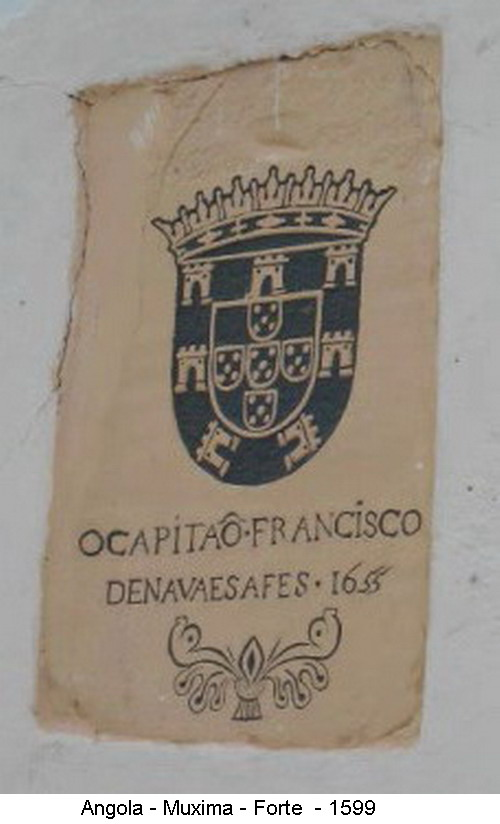
- Muxima Fort
- Interactive map of Fortress of Muxima; Fortaleza de Muxima
- Location: Muxima, Angola
- Built: 1599

The Fortress of Muxima (Portuguese: Fortaleza de Muxima), built of stone and mortar in 1599, is situated in the Bengo Province of Angola on the Cuanza River.

== History ==
Established in 1599, the Fortress of Muxima is located on the left bank of the Cuanza River in the town of Muxima, in Bengo Province. It was the first prison of the Angolan occupation period. It helped advance penetration to the interior of the Angolan territory and defend against the Angolan people who offered resistance to the Portuguese colonizers and other colonial potentates whose ships traveled the Cuanza River looking for slaves. Its building would come to support trading relationships including ivory trade and slave trafficking. The Fortress was used as the base of support for Portuguese forces when they traveled to the interior instigating raids and promoting Portuguese interests during the Kwata-Kwata Wars (wars among the Africans who, working with the Europeans, captured other Africans for slavery). Captives were forced to walk to the town of Calumbo or were transported by boat on the Cuanza River to the Muxima harbor where they were shipped to the Americas. The Fortress was classified as a National Monument by Provincial Decree No. 2, of 12 January 1924. The Fortress is a state property but is badly preserved. The Ministry of Culture is responsible for its maintenance and preservation.

== World Heritage status ==
This site was added to the UNESCO World Heritage Tentative List on 22 November 1996 in the Cultural category.

== See also ==
- World Heritage sites in Africa
- History of Angola
- Portuguese Angola
- Angolan Wars
- Fortress of Massangano
- Fortress of Cambambe
