= Grupo Boavida =

Grupo Boavida S.A.
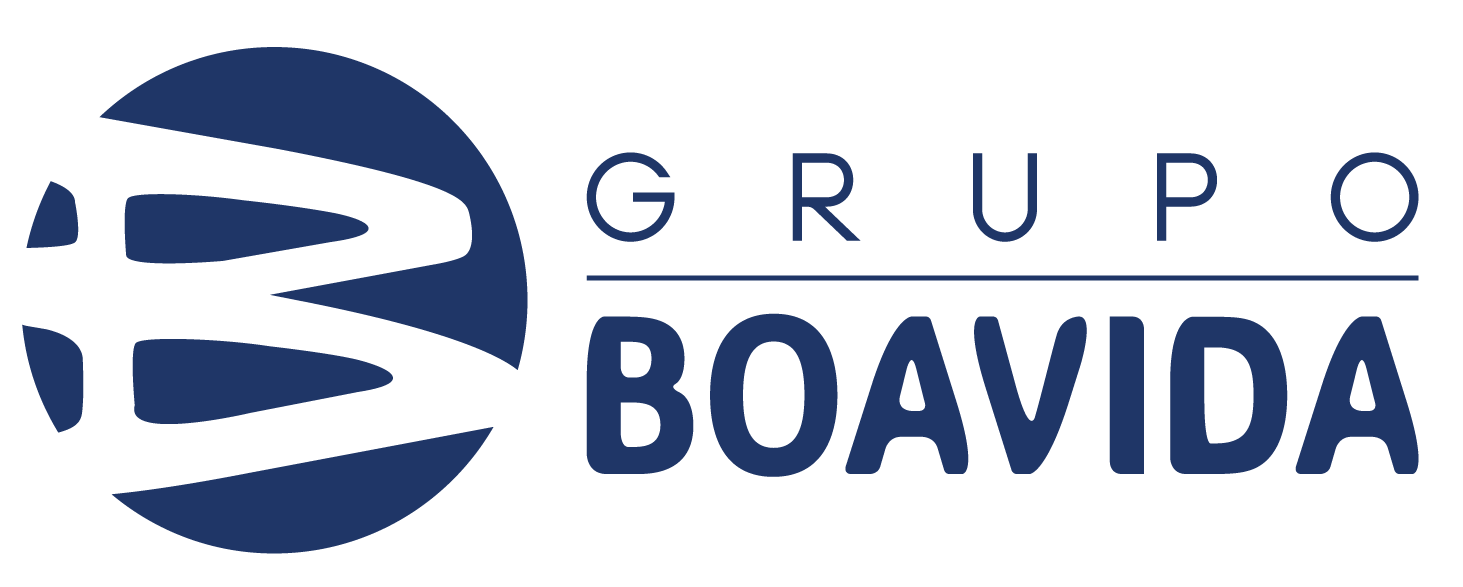
- Type: Sociedade Anônima
- Industry: Conglomerate
- Founded: 1996; 30 years ago
- Founder: Mariusz Dowbor
- Headquarters: Luanda, Angola
- Key people: Tomasz Dowbor, CEO Wojciech Dowbor co-CEO
- Products: House-building, Real estate development
- Brands: Fiscalense; Gramapol; Kimiame (formerly Agripol); Marcepol; NOAH Constructions; SHAOLIN; Verenapol
- Operating income: ▼US$ 400 million(2024)
- Total assets: ▲US$ 600 million (2024)
- Number of employees: 8806 (2025)
- Website: grupoboavida.co.ao

Grupo Boavida is an Angolan business conglomerate founded on December 8, 1996, by Mariusz Dowbor. Headquartered in Luanda, the group began its activities in the engineering and civil construction sector, later expanding into the medium and high-end real estate sector, agribusiness, and project management. Since 2014, the company has been led by Tomasz Dowbor and Wojciech Dowbor, sons of the founder, who are responsible for large-scale residential and commercial projects, such as Urbanização Boa Vida and Cidade Boa Vida.

== History ==
Grupo Boavida originated with the creation of Poltec Investimentos, founded by engineer Mariusz Dowbor. The company began its activities in the engineering and construction sector, developing large-scale projects in the country.

In 2014, under the direction of Tomasz Dowbor and Wojciech Dowbor, Poltec Investimentos began the construction of Urbanização Boa Vida, a real estate project aimed at creating housing infrastructure in Luanda.

In 2016, the company diversified its activities into the agribusiness sector, with the aim of reducing dependence on imported food. With the expansion of the business, Poltec Investimentos was renamed Grupo Boavida, now as a conglomerate.

In 2020, facing a company crisis due to the devaluation of the kwanza, they launched the Cidade Boa Vida project, a planned city with areas dedicated to housing, commerce, education, and infrastructure, focusing on residential, commercial, and urban infrastructure areas.

Currently, Grupo Boavida operates in the sectors of engineering, construction, carpentry, and agribusiness in Angola. The company works with professionals from eight nationalities and six local dialects.

== Managed projects ==
The group develops residential and commercial projects, including condominiums such as Vereda das Flores, Real Park, Ville Vermont, Hipicus, Solida Plaza, and Infinity I and II. Among its ongoing projects are Urbanização Boa Vida and Cidade Boa Vida.

Urbanização Boa Vida is a real estate development located in Angola, part of the Cidade Boa Vida project. Currently, with approximately 3.5 million square meters of area, the development includes residences, urban equipment, and services. The project plans the construction of 5,000 homes distributed across 22 private condominiums, of which 17 have already been completed. Urbanização Boa Vida includes residential units with T3 to T5 layouts.

== Grupo Boavida brands ==
Grupo Boavida manages several subsidiary companies operating in different sectors, including construction, interior decoration, project management, and industry. Among them, Marcepol works with wood transformation and the supply of boards for furniture; Gramapol operates in ornamental rock processing; and Verenapol in the administration and management of residential condominiums, buildings, shopping centers, and industrial facilities, as well as services such as cleaning, gardening, and technical maintenance. Other subsidiaries include NOAH Constructions, SHAOLIN, Fiscalense (which carries out infrastructure works), and Kimiame, formerly Agripol, focused on family farming.

== Social projects ==
=== Fundação Mariusz Dowbor ===
It is a non-profit social solidarity institution created by entrepreneurs Tomasz Dowbor and Wojciech Dowbor, in honor of their father, Mariusz Dowbor. It works in the areas of inclusion, culture, and education, focusing on supporting local communities.

=== Social Support ===
The company maintains food and school support initiatives for institutions such as Lar Mamã Madalena, in the municipality of Cazenga. Additionally, it has organized charity events, such as a Christmas party for children in the municipality of Caxito.

== Awards ==
| Year | Award | Category | Ref. |
|---|---|---|---|
| 2018 | Prémios Sírius | Best Exporting Company of Angola | |
