= Francisco Romão =

Angolan politician

Provincial Commissioner of Luanda
- In office 1980–1981
- Preceded by: Mendes de Carvalho
- Succeeded by: Evaristo Domingos Kimba

Ambassador of Angola to Yugoslavia
- In office 1981–1987
- Preceded by: João Filipe Martins
- Succeeded by: Manuel Bernardo de Sousa

Ambassador of Angola to Brazil
- In office 1987–1993
- Preceded by: Position established
- Succeeded by: Manuel Alfredo Salvaterra

Deputy Foreign Minister
- In office 2002–2004

Personal details
- Born: October 1, 1942 Luanda, Angola
- Died: 25 July 2004 (aged 61) Luanda, Angola
- Party: MPLA

Francisco Romão de Oliveira e Silva (October 1, 1942 – July 25, 2004) was an Angolan politician who served as the deputy foreign minister. He played an important part in Angola's war of independence against Portugal.

He was the Governor of Luanda Province from 1980 to 1981, ambassador to Yugoslavia from 1981 to 1987 and ambassador to Brazil from 1987 to 1993.

He died in an apparent suicide by leaping from the eighth story of the Hotel Presidente in the capital city, Luanda.
