= Icolo e Bengo Province =

Province of Angola

Icolo e Bengo
- Province
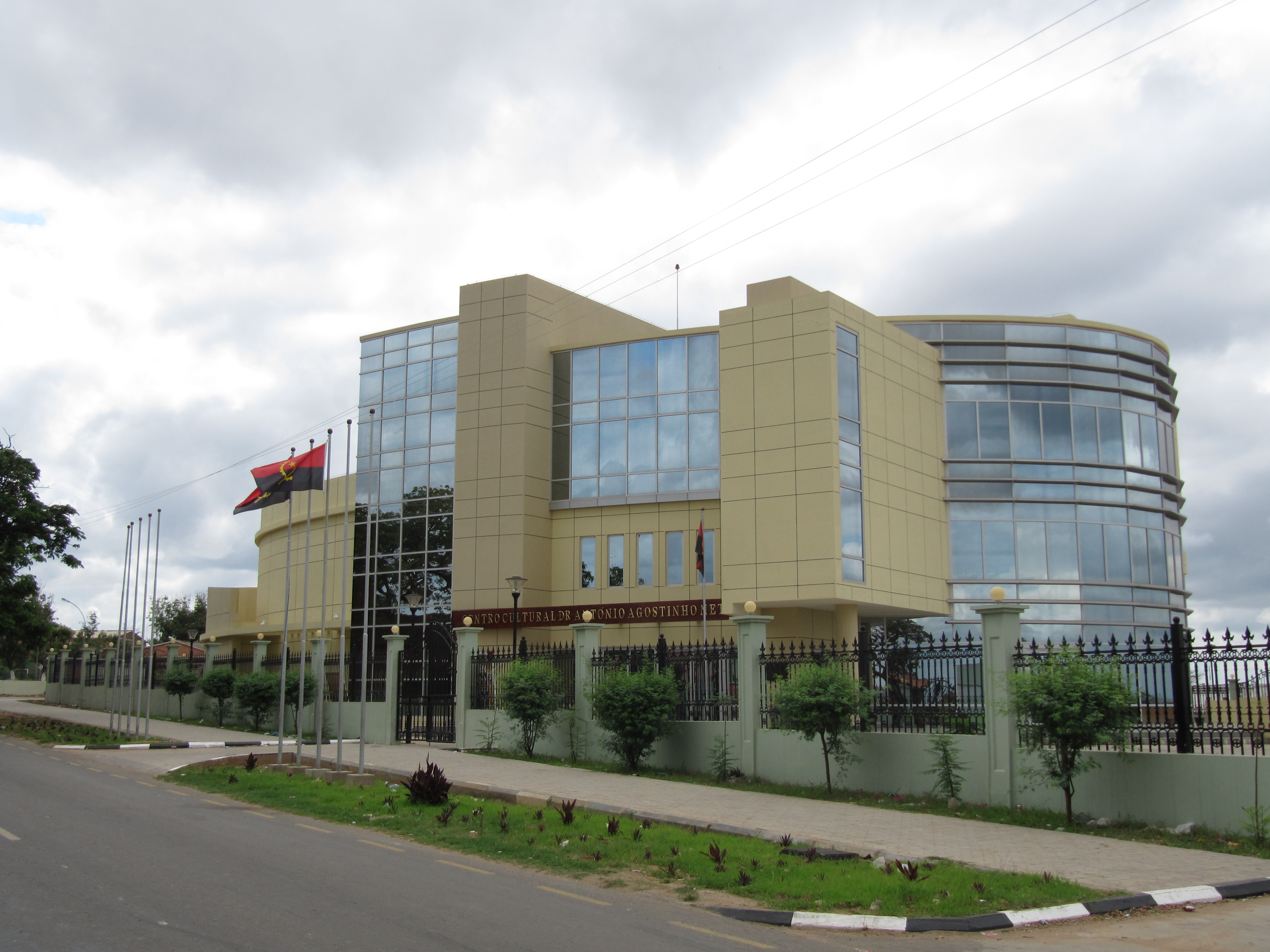
- Agostinho Neto Cultural Center in Catete

- Coordinates: 9.5°S 13.5°E
- Country: Angola
- Established: 5 September 2024
- Capital: Catete

Government
  - Governor: Auzílio de Oliveira Martins Jacob (MPLA)
  - Vice-Governor for Political, Social and Economic Sector: Agostinho Pedro Antonio
  - Vice-Governor for Technical Services and Infrastructure: Zenilda Leila do Amaral Manding

Area
  - Total: 17,150 km^{2} (6,620 sq mi)

Population (Census 2024)
  - Total: 1,372,670
  - Density: 80.04/km^{2} (207.3/sq mi)
- Time zone: UTC+1 (WAT)

Icolo e Bengo is a province of Angola. It was created on 5 September 2024 from Luanda Province. Its capital is Catete.

== Geography and climate ==
Icolo e Bengo borders the Angolan provinces of Luanda to the northwest, Bengo to the north, Cuanza Norte to the east, and Cuanza Sul to the south. It also borders the Atlantic Ocean to the west. The boundary between Icolo e Bengo and Luanda follows the Cuanza River, the Kikuxi Canal, and the Via Expressa Fidel Castro and EN-100 highways.

Icolo e Bengo is located on the floodplains of the Bengo, Cuanza and Longa rivers. The province is located in the Angolan Scarp savanna and woodlands ecoregion, and it contains Quiçama National Park.

Icolo e Bengo experiences a tropical climate with summer rain. The interaction between the cold Benguela Current and warm equatorial waters produces mist, causing humidity in the area to stay high year-round while annual rainfall is low, ranging from 350 to 650 mm (14 to 26 in).

== History ==
On 14 August 2024, Angola's National Assembly approved a law to create three new provinces, including separating the less urbanized portions of Luanda Province from the city of Luanda to form the new province of Icolo e Bengo. This law went into effect with its publication in the official gazette of Angola on 5 September 2024.

== Administration ==
Icolo e Bengo is divided into the seven municipalities of Bom Jesus, Cabiri, Cabo Ledo, Calumbo, Catete, Quiçama, and Sequele. Catete is further subdivided into the communes of Caculo Cahango, Cassoneca, Catete, and Caxicane; Quiçama is subdivided into the communes of Demba Chio, Mumbondo, Muxima, and Quixinge; and Sequele is subdivided into the communes of Funda, Quifangondo, and Sequele.

The first governor of Icolo e Bengo is Auzílio de Oliveira Jacob, who was appointed in December 2024.

== Economy and infrastructure ==
In contrast to the economy of Luanda, which is more oriented towards the service sector, Icolo e Bengo's economy is expected to focus more on agriculture and industry.

Dr. Antonio Agostinho Neto International Airport is located in Icolo e Bengo. The EN-230 highway and the Luanda Railway also run east to west across the northern part of the province.

At the time of its establishment, Icolo e Bengo had three hospitals: one was in the capital of Catete, and two others had been recently constructed in Zango and Sequele.
