= Basilica of the Immaculate Conception, Mongomo =

Church in Mongomo, Equatorial Guinea

Coordinates: 1°37′20.07″N 11°17′56.03″E

Basilica of the Immaculate Conception
- Basílica de la Inmaculada Concepción de Mongomo
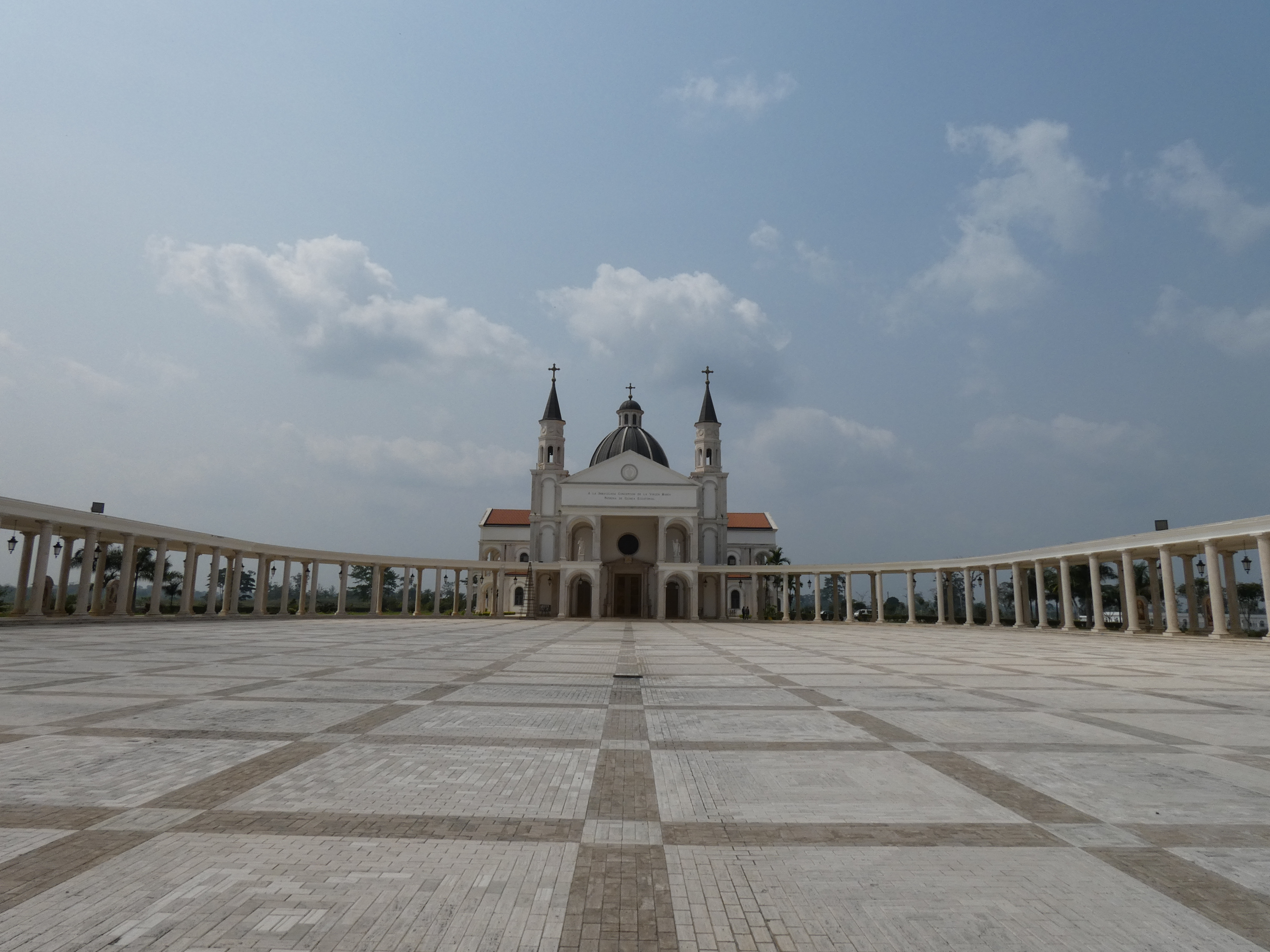
- Basilica of the Immaculate Conception
- Location: Mongomo
- Country: Equatorial Guinea
- Denomination: Roman Catholic Church

History
- Consecrated: 2011

Architecture
- Architectural type: New Classical architecture

The Basilica of the Immaculate Conception (Spanish: Basílica de la Inmaculada Concepción de Mongomo or Basilica de Mongomo) is a Roman Catholic basilica, built in the province of Mongomo in the African country of Equatorial Guinea. The temple is sometimes mistakenly referred to as a "cathedral" for its large size, however it is not based on any bishopric, so it does not enjoy that status. The Basilica of Mongomo is currently the largest religious building in Central Africa and the second largest Catholic church throughout Africa, after the Basilica of Our Lady of Peace in Ivory Coast.

== History ==
The basilica was begun in 2006, funded by the Equatorial Guinean state, and built by the Italian company Makinen Venture. Another Italian company, Ruffini Decorazioni, has been responsible for the interiors and finishes. The basilica has a capacity to accommodate one thousand faithful, and as the name suggests is dedicated to the Immaculate Conception, patroness of Equatorial Guinea. Inside the basilica a replica of the Esperanza Macarena venerates, which was brought from Seville, Spain.

The basilica was officially consecrated on December 7, 2011 by Nigerian Cardinal Francis Arinze, president of the Pontifical Council for Interreligious Dialogue, on behalf of Pope Benedict XVI. Cardinal Arinze accompanied the Apostolic Nuncio to Equatorial Guinea, Cameroon and Gabon, Piero Pioppo, several bishops and more than two hundred priests. During the ceremony, reading the decree that the Vatican gave this church the dignity of minor basilica was given.

== See also ==
- Roman Catholicism in Equatorial Guinea
