= Barra do Cuanza =

Coordinates: 9°18′S 13°08′E

- commune
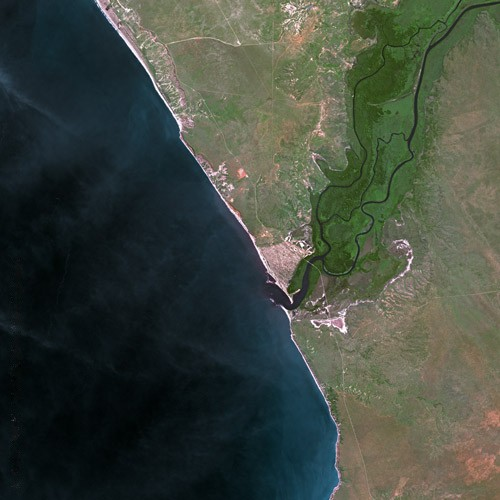
- Satellite view of Cuanza

- Location in Angola
- Country: Angola
- Province: Luanda

Area
  - Total: 147 sq mi (382 km^{2})

Population (2014)
  - Total: 5,779
  - Density: 39.2/sq mi (15.1/km^{2})
- Time zone: UTC+1 (WAT)

Barra do Cuanza is a town and commune of Angola, located in the province of Luanda.

== See also ==
- Communes of Angola
