= Demba Chio =

Administrative unit in Luanda Province, Angola

- Commune
- Country: Angola
- Province: Icolo e Bengo
- Municipality: Quiçama

Area
  - Total: 2,780 km^{2} (1,070 sq mi)

Population (2014)
  - Total: 1,013
  - Density: 0.364/km^{2} (0.944/sq mi)
- Time zone: UTC+1 (WAT)

Demba Chio is a commune in the municipality of Quiçama, Icolo e Bengo Province, Angola.
