= Luanda Municipality =

Municipality of Angola

Coordinates: 8°50′49″S 13°16′17″E

The Municipality of Luanda is one of the nine municipalities that make up the province of Luanda, Angola. It covers roughly 116 km^{2} (45 sq mi) (second smallest in the province) and includes Ilha de Luanda. The population was 2,194,747 at the 2014 census and is projected to be 2,571,861 in 2019 per Instituto Nacional de Estatística, República de Angola.

== Administrative divisions ==
The municipality of Luanda is made up of six urban districts:

- Ingombota
- Rangel
- Maianga
- Angola Quiluanje
- Samba
- Sambizanga
