= Fortress of Kambambe =

Coordinates: 9°44′32.36″S 14°29′15.14″E

Fortress of Cambambe Fortaleza de Cambambe
- Interactive map of Fortress of Cambambe; Fortaleza de Cambambe
- Location: Cambambe, Angola

History
- Built: 1603

The Fortress of Kambambe (or Cambambe; Portuguese: Fortaleza de Cambambe) is a historic stronghold built by the Portuguese Empire on the east bank of the Cuanza River in Cambambe, Province of Cuanza Norte Province, Angola.

== History ==
The governor of Angola Manuel Cerveira Pereira marched with his forces towards Cambambe and on 10 August 1603 fought the soba or tribal lord Cafuxe, who was defeated. Continuing his march, Pereira built a fort in Cambambe and forced soba Cambambe to submit. The original fort was constructed in 1604. Additional construction occurred in 1691 by governor João de Lencastre as a point of support to the conquest and penetration of Angolan territory through the Cuanza River. The date of construction was 1691 according to the pediment over the entrance door. Its plan was square with bastions on the edges, and furnished with bronze and iron artillery. It was built by the first falls on the river Cuanza. Besides enforcing the armed presence of Portugal, the fortress was used for the storage of prisoners and goods awaiting shipment to the Americas. Cambambe was an important center for illegal activity and the slave trade. The Fortress of Kambambe was classified as National Monument by Provincial Decree Number 67, dated May 30, 1925. Later it fell into ruins and is a state property. The Angola Ministry of Culture currently has responsibility for its maintenance and preservation

== Design ==
The Fortress of Kambambe was built in the shape of a square with bastions at the four corners and an emblazoned entranceway along baroque lines, according to the model of 17th century military art. The pediment of the entrance gate is marked with the date 1691 and topped by a coat of arms. Originally it was protected by artillery pieces of bronze and iron.

== World Heritage Status ==
The Fortress of Kambambe was added to the UNESCO World Heritage Site Tentative List on November 22, 1996 in the Cultural category.

== See also ==
- History of Angola
- Portuguese Angola
- Angolan Wars

== Images ==
Fortress: Kambambe, Cambambe, Kwanza, Angola.
