= Quixinge =

Quixinge Kixinje
- commune
- Location in Angola
- Country: Angola
- Province: Icolo e Bengo
- Municipality: Quiçama

Area
  - Total: 2,860 km^{2} (1,100 sq mi)

Population (2014)
  - Total: 2,244
  - Density: 0.785/km^{2} (2.03/sq mi)
- Time zone: UTC+1 (WAT)

Quixinge is a commune in the municipality of Quiçama, Icolo e Bengo Province, Angola.

== Transport ==
It is served by an extension of a branch railway of the northern railway.

== See also ==
- Railway stations in Angola
