= Cabo Ledo =

Coordinates: 9°39′S 13°14′E

- Municipality
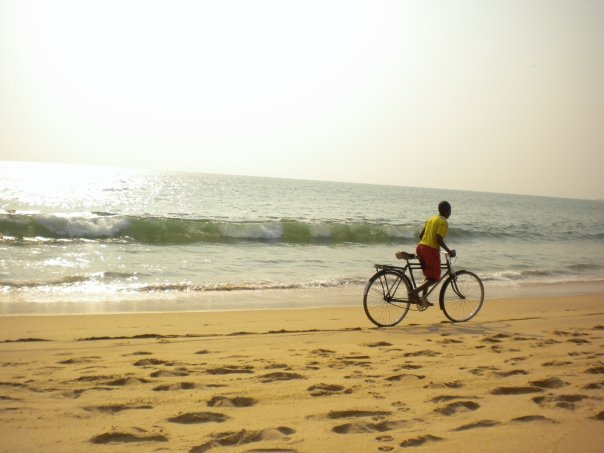
- Boy cycling on the beach in Cabo Ledo

- Location in Angola
- Country: Angola
- Province: Icolo e Bengo

Area
  - Total: 4,000 km^{2} (1,500 sq mi)

Population (2014)
  - Total: 11,709
  - Density: 2.9/km^{2} (7.6/sq mi)
- Time zone: UTC+1 (WAT)

Cabo Ledo is a municipality in the province of Icolo e Bengo in Angola. Prior to the creation of Icolo e Bengo Province in 2024, it had been a commune in the municipality of Quicama in Luanda Province.
