= Bamenda Airport =

Airport in Northwest, Cameroon

Bamenda Military Airport
- IATA: BPC; ICAO: FKKV

Summary
- Airport type: Public
- Operator: Government
- Serves: Bamenda, Cameroon
- Elevation AMSL: 4,065 ft / 1,239 m
- Coordinates: 06°02′21.0″N 010°07′21.4″E

Map
- Location of Bamenda Airport in Cameroon.

Runways
Direction	Length		Surface
Direction	m	ft	Surface
17/35	2,500	8,202	Asphalt
- Source: DAFIF

Bamenda Airport (IATA: BPC, ICAO: FKKV) is an airport serving Bamenda, the capital of the Northwest Province in Cameroon. The airport was previously served by Camair-Co starting in 2017, offering passenger services to Douala and Yaoundé. On December 1, 2019, a Camair-Co aircraft was fired upon while approaching Bamenda Airport for landing. No casualties occurred, and the aircraft landed safely despite damage to its fuselage. All operations were suspended due to the Anglophone Crisis in 2020.
