= Hoji Ya Henda =

Coordinates: 14°39′S 17°41′E

- commune
- Location in Angola
- Country: Angola
- Province: Luanda
- Time zone: UTC+1 (WAT)

Hoji Ya Henda is a town and commune of Angola, located in the province of Luanda.

== See also ==
- Communes of Angola
