= Palácio de Ferro =

Historic building in Luanda, Angola

Coordinates: 8.812011°S 13.235551°E

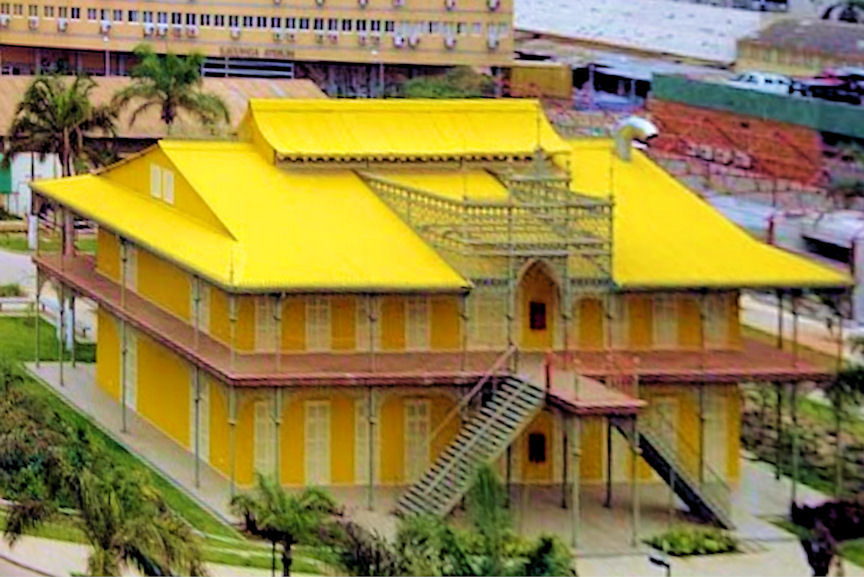
- Palácio de Ferro circa 2011

General information
- Location: Luanda, Angola
- Construction started: 1890s

Palácio de Ferro (English: Iron Palace) is a historical building in the Angolan capital Luanda, believed to have been designed and built by Gustave Eiffel, designer of the Eiffel Tower and builder of the Statue of Liberty, or by someone associated with him.

== History ==
The history of the structure is shrouded in mystery since no official record of it exists. It is believed to have been pre-built in the 1890s in France and was destined to be placed in Madagascar via boat. Instead, the building ended up in Angola's Skeleton Coast after the ship carrying it was grounded by the notorious Benguela Current. Portuguese rulers of the colony then claimed the ship along with all its contents, including the palace.

During the Portuguese era, the building had a great deal of prestige and it was used as an art center. But after the independence of Angola, the palace was left in neglect with its surrounding area eventually ending up as a parking lot. It was also heavily damaged during the Angolan Civil War leaving some of its structures in a rusted and rotting condition.

The building was renovated in 2009 funded by profits from Angola's oil boom with the help of Brazilian construction companies, as many of the reclaimed iron balustrades and floor tiles were individually renovated in Rio de Janeiro. It now stands as the symbol of the city's rebirth as well as a point of social reference for the future. The Ministry of Culture of Angola is still deciding whether the building is to become a diamond museum or a restaurant.
