= Cazenga =

Coordinates: 08°49′17″S 13°17′28″E

- City
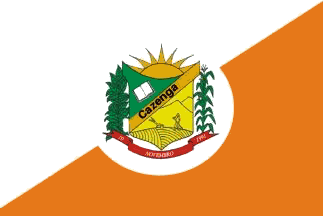
- Flag
- Interactive map of Cazenga
- Country: Angola
- Province: Luanda
- Municipality: Cazenga
- Established: January 9, 1946

Area
  - Total: 33.12 km^{2} (12.79 sq mi)

Population (2014)
  - Total: 892,401
  - Estimate (2019): 1,045,722

Cazenga is a city and the most densely populated of the nine municipalities that make up the province of Luanda, Angola. It has a population of 892,401 (2014 census), with an estimated 1,045,722 in 2019, covering an area of 33.13 km^{2} under the municipal boundaries in force since 5 September 2024.

== Administrative divisions ==
The municipality of Cazenga is made up of three communes:

- Cazenga
- Tala Hady
- Hoji Ya Henda

== Transportation ==
Cazenga is the site of the workshops for the Luanda Railway.

== Utilities ==
In a 1974 article American political scientist Gerald J. Bender wrote: "Another account of the sale of water to Africans can be found in the Luandan newspaper, Província de Angola. The article reported that water is sold in the slum of Cazenga at an average price of 2.5 escudos (about ten American cents) for five gallons. (The legal minimum daily wage for the district of Luanda in July 1974 was 25 escudos - about one American dollar-per day.)

== See also ==
- Railway stations in Angola
