= Maianga =

Urban District of Luanda

- Administrative Division of Luanda
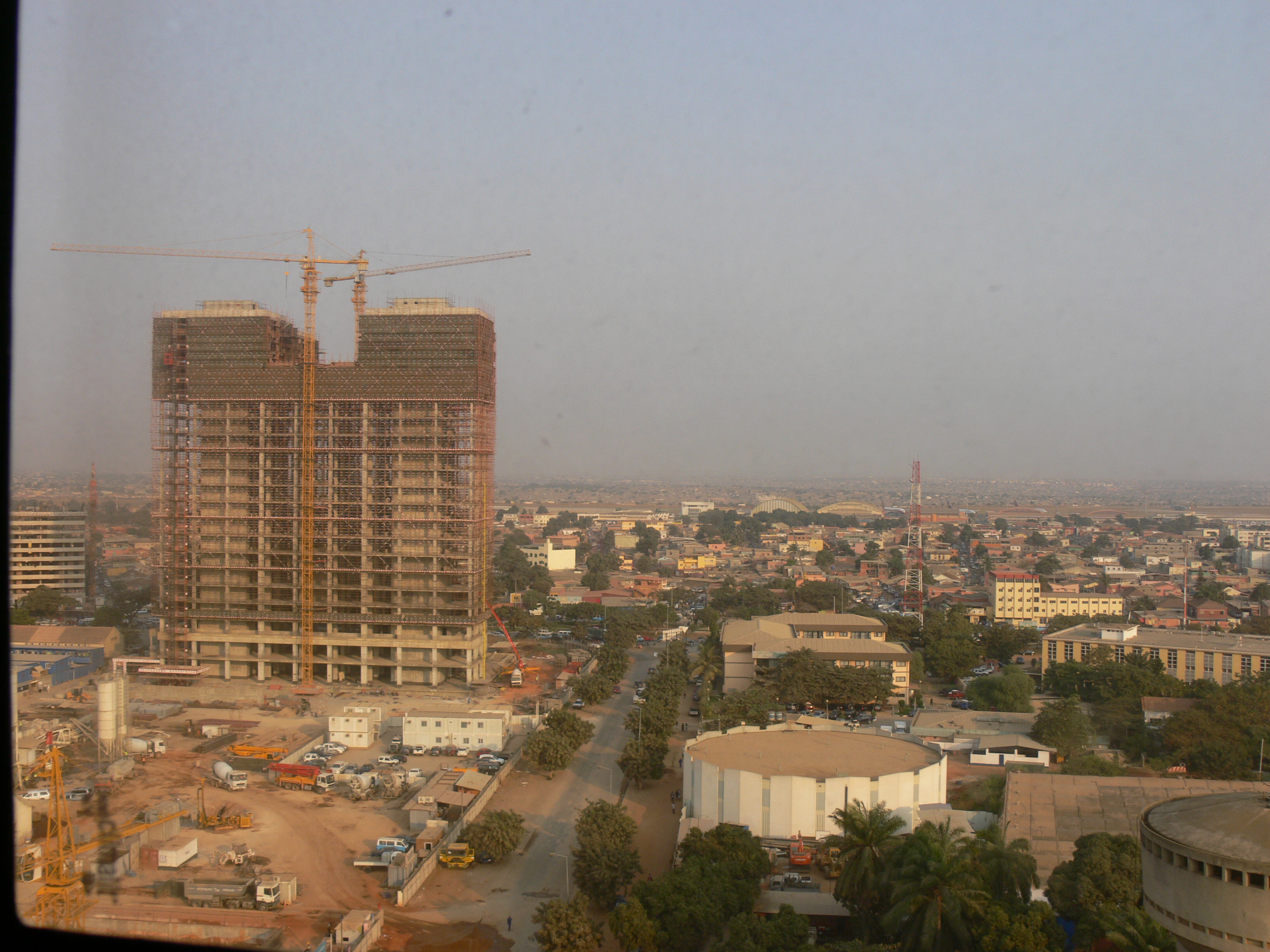
- New Construction in Maianga
- Interactive map of Maianga
- Coordinates: 8°49′05″S 13°13′44″E
- Country: Angola
- Province: Luanda
- Founded: 1576

Area
  - Total: 24.7 km^{2} (9.5 sq mi)
- Elevation: 6 m (20 ft)

Population (2020)
  - Total: 319,000
  - Density: 12,900/km^{2} (33,400/sq mi)
- Time zone: +1
- HDI (2019): 0.697; Medium

Maianga is one of the six municipalities of the administrative division of the province of Luanda, Angola. In 2011, as part of a restructuring of Luanda's regional government, the municipality was designated as one of Luanda's six urban districts. The area is one of the older quarters of Luanda and was established before independence. The area is best known for Quatro de Fevereiro Airport and its strong musical culture.

== History ==
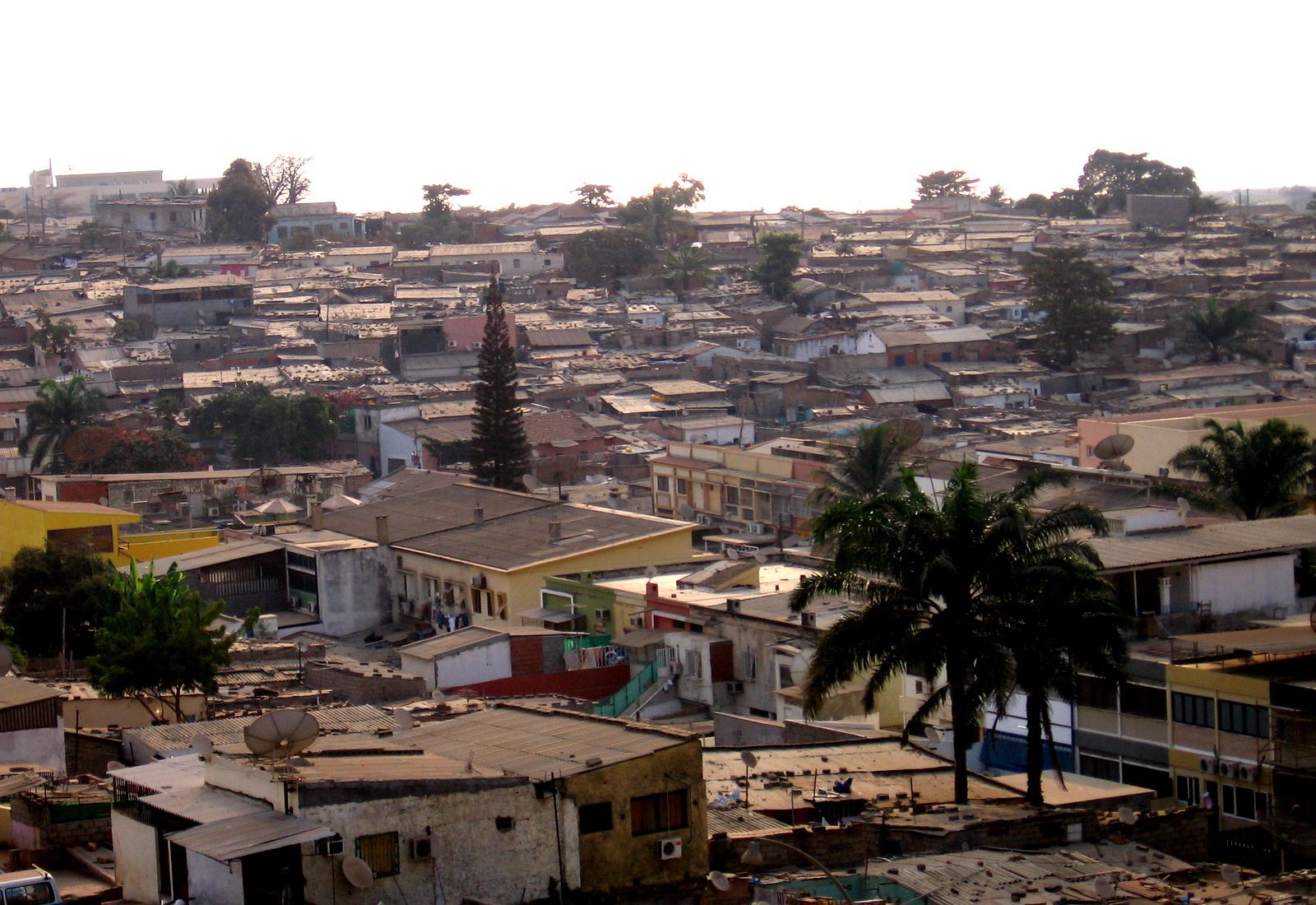
Informal Settlements in Maianga

The name Maianga comes from the word Kimbundu Mazanga which means ponds. Before being urbanized, Maianga was an area known as a place that was routinely submerged by rainwater. The area was attractive to residents on account of the existence of two wells called Maianga do Rei and Maianga do Povo. The wells are located in the neighborhoods of Prenda and Cassenda.

The northern part of Maianga is an extension of the colonial center of Luanda. The neighborhoods in the northern part of Maianga are formally built and set on paved streets with city services. Neighborhoods along Avenue Revolução de Outubro and to the south of Quatro de Fevereiro Airport are densely populated, informally built and set on dirt roads with limited access to fresh water and electricity. The area grew rapidly during the Angolan Civil War and in the years after Angola's independence from Portugal. The area is now fully urbanized and is undergoing an extensive amount of construction as a result of Luanda's prosperous real-estate economy. Several large office towers and a multi-story shopping center were built between 2018 and 2020 at the intersection of Largo de Rio de Janeiro and Ho Chi Minh Avenue. Maianga is also home to Luanda's water treatment plant and a large power generation plant.

== Orientation ==
Maianga, is located on the southern edge of the center of Luanda. The neighborhood is bounded by dos Heróis Street to the west, Kwame Nkrumah Street and Avenue Deolinda Rodrigues to the north, the Cambamba River to the east and south and da Fapa Street to the south. Due to the informal nature of construction and street layouts, the southern and eastern borders have loose definitions. In recent years dos Heróis Street has been upgraded into a multi-lane closed access highway known as the EN-100 Highway which connects the Port of Luanda to the southern suburbs of the city and on to the port city of Lobito. The northern part of Maianga is more formally urbanized while the southern and eastern portions are largely defined by unpermitted construction and dirt lanes.

The district is bordered to the north by the urban districts of Ingombota and Rangel, to the south by Samba and to the east by the municipality of Quilamba Quiaxi. It is one of the six urban districts of the City of Luanda.

== Culture ==
As a historic and working-class neighborhood of Luanda, the city has a strong and important history of musical innovation. Several famous Angolan musicians hail from Maianga including Calibrados and Tony Mad.

== Transportation ==
Quatro de Fevereiro Airport is located in the District of Maianga. The airport was constructed in 1951 in order to serve the region. At the time of its construction Maianga was largely made up of farmland and informal settlements. With the explosive growth of Luanda in the post-colonial period, the airport is now located well within the urban center. Due to space constraints and outdated facilities, Angola International Airport 40 kilometers to the southwest of the center of Luanda and will replace Quatro de Fevereiro Airport as the primary point of entry to Angola for international flights. The Airport is connected to the Ingombota by the Avenue Revolução de Outubro.

== Administrative Division ==
- Maianga
- Prenda
- Cassequel

== Neighborhoods ==
- Bairro da Maianga
- Catambor
- Cassenda
- Bairro do Prenda
- Bairro do Catinton
- Rocha Pinto
- Calemba
- Serpa Pinto
- Bairro Jumbo
- Morro da Luz
- Margoso (chabá)
- Gamek Martires do Kifangondo
- Sagrada Esperança
- Alvalade Bairro Cassequel
- Lourenço
- Teixeira
- Baobab
