= Calumbo =

- Municipality
- Location in Angola
- Coordinates: 9.15°S 13.41°E
- Country: Angola
- Province: Icolo e Bengo

Area
  - Total: 129 km^{2} (50 sq mi)

Population (2024 census)
  - Total: 652,270
  - Density: 5,060/km^{2} (13,100/sq mi)
- Time zone: UTC+1 (WAT)

Calumbo is a municipality in the province of Icolo e Bengo in Angola. Prior to the creation of Icolo e Bengo in 2024, it had been a commune in the province of Luanda. The municipality had a population of 652,270 in 2024.
