= Cambambe =

- Municipality
- Location in Angola
- Coordinates: 09°45′31″S 14°30′44″E
- Country: Angola
- Province: Cuanza Norte

Population (2014 Census)
  - Total: 90,766
- Time zone: UTC+1 (WAT)
- Climate: BSh

Cambambe is a municipality in Cuanza Norte Province in Angola. It is the site of a hydroelectric dam on the Cuanza River. Cambambe also contains ruins from the 17th-century Portuguese settlement of the area, including the Church of Nossa Senhora do Rosario and the Fortress of Kambambe. The municipality had a population of 90,766 in 2014.
