= Mumbondo =

- Commune
- Location in Angola
- Country: Angola
- Province: Icolo e Bengo
- Municipality: Quiçama

Area
  - Total: 1,640 km^{2} (630 sq mi)

Population (2014)
  - Total: 3,414
  - Density: 2.08/km^{2} (5.39/sq mi)
- Time zone: UTC+1 (WAT)

Mumbondo is a town and commune in the municipality of Quiçama, Icolo e Bengo Province, Angola.
