= Viana, Luanda =

Angolan city and municipality of Luanda Province

Viana
- City and province
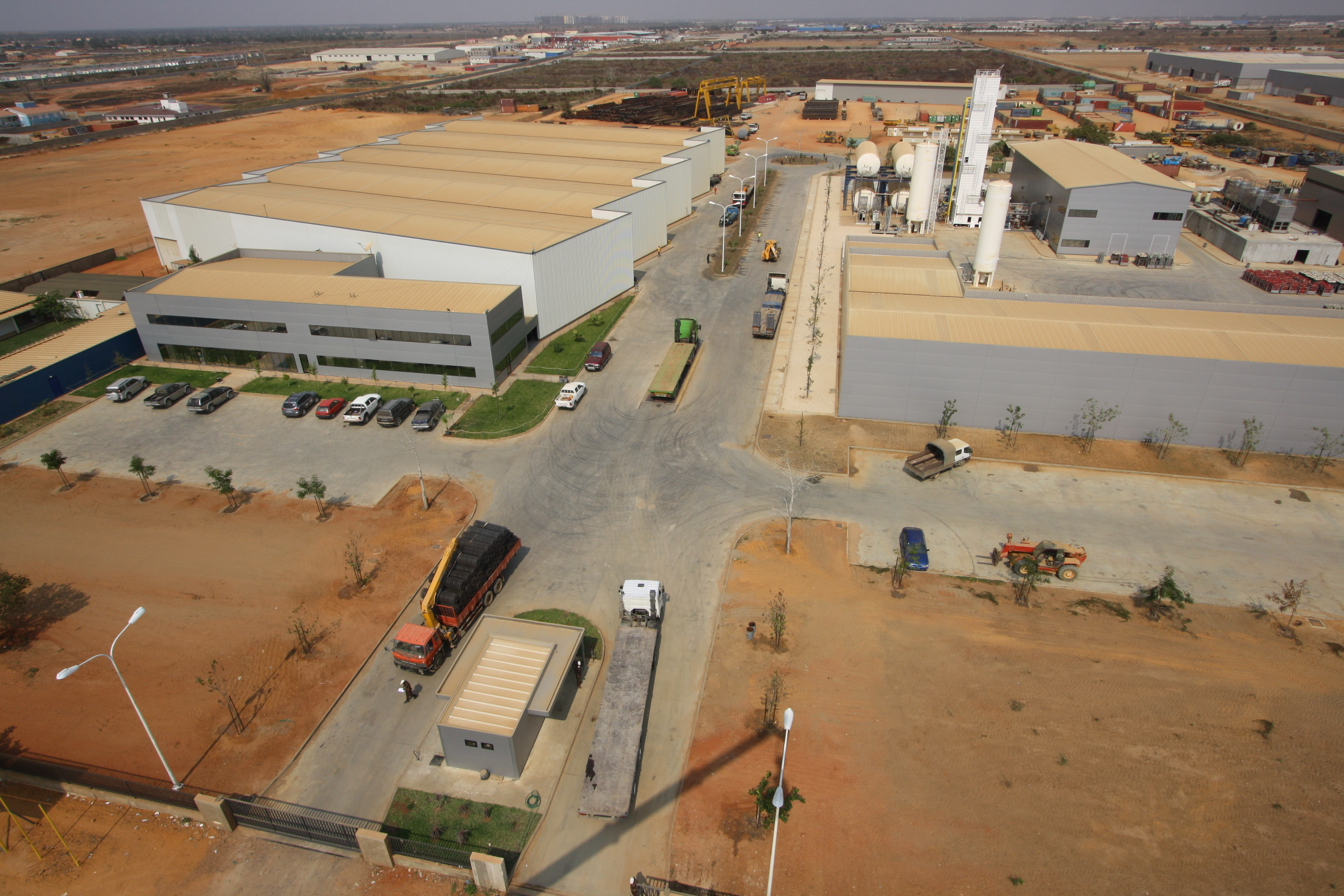
- Acail metallurgical industry, in the Viana Industrial Sector, in 2010

- Viana's location in Angola
- Coordinates: 08°54′09″S 13°22′20″E
- Country: Angola
- Province: Luanda Province
- Established: 13 December 1963

Population (2024)
  - Total: 865,863
- Time zone: UTC+1:00 (WAT)

Viana is a city and one of the nine municipalities that make up the province of Luanda in Angola. Viana lies 15 to 30 kilometers east as a suburb of the capital Luanda and had a population of 865,863 at the 2024 census, including about 6,000 long-term refugees primarily from Katanga Province in the Democratic Republic of the Congo.

The city was founded on 13 December 1963.

== Administrative divisions ==
The municipality of Viana is made up of three communes:

- Zango
- Calumbo
- Viana

== Transportation ==
Near Viana the new airport of Luanda, the Angola International Airport, will be built by the Chinese company China International Fund. Because of financial problems the project is on hold.

Viana is served by a station on the northern line of Angolan Railways (CFL).

It is to become a dry port.

== See also ==
- Railway stations in Angola
- Transport in Angola
