= EN-100 =

Road in Angola

N100 Road
- National Road No. 100

Route information
- Maintained by Angola National Highways Authority

Major junctions
- North end: Massabi
- South end: Foz do Cunene

Location
- Country: Angola

Highway system
- Transport in Angola

National Road No. 100, better known by its prefix EN-100, is a national route in Angola that spans approximately 1,800 kilometers along the coast. It stretches from Massabi, on the border with the Republic of Congo in the north, to Foz do Cunene, on the border with Namibia in the south. The road passes through the Cabinda exclave and cities including Luanda, Benguela, and Moçâmedes, forming a north–south route.

== Route ==
=== Cabinda ===
The EN-100 originates on the border with the Republic of Congo in Angola's northern exclave of Cabinda, where it connects to the Congolese N4 road leading to Pointe-Noire. The road traverses 120 kilometers through Cabinda, running parallel to the coast and passing through a mix of forests and meadows on flat terrain. The entire Cabinda section is paved, including a stretch through the town of Cabinda, which features partial dual carriageways. South of Cabinda, the road reaches the border with the Democratic Republic of Congo, where another road continues to the nearby city of Muanda, connecting to the N1 road from Kinshasa.

=== Northern Angola ===
The EN-100 begins in the city of Soyo, located 40 kilometers south of the Congo River's mouth in the Atlantic Ocean. The N'zeto-Soyo road runs parallel to or overlaps with the EN-100 between Soyo and N'Zeto, where it connects to the N210. The EN-100 crosses the mouth of the River Mebridege and continues southward, parallel to the Angolan coast, passing through a savannah region with scattered vegetation and low population density. The road intersects with the N220 at Ambriz. From there, the EN-100 becomes a fast, asphalted road that traverses the savannah to the capital city of Luanda, following a slightly inland route.

=== Luanda Region ===
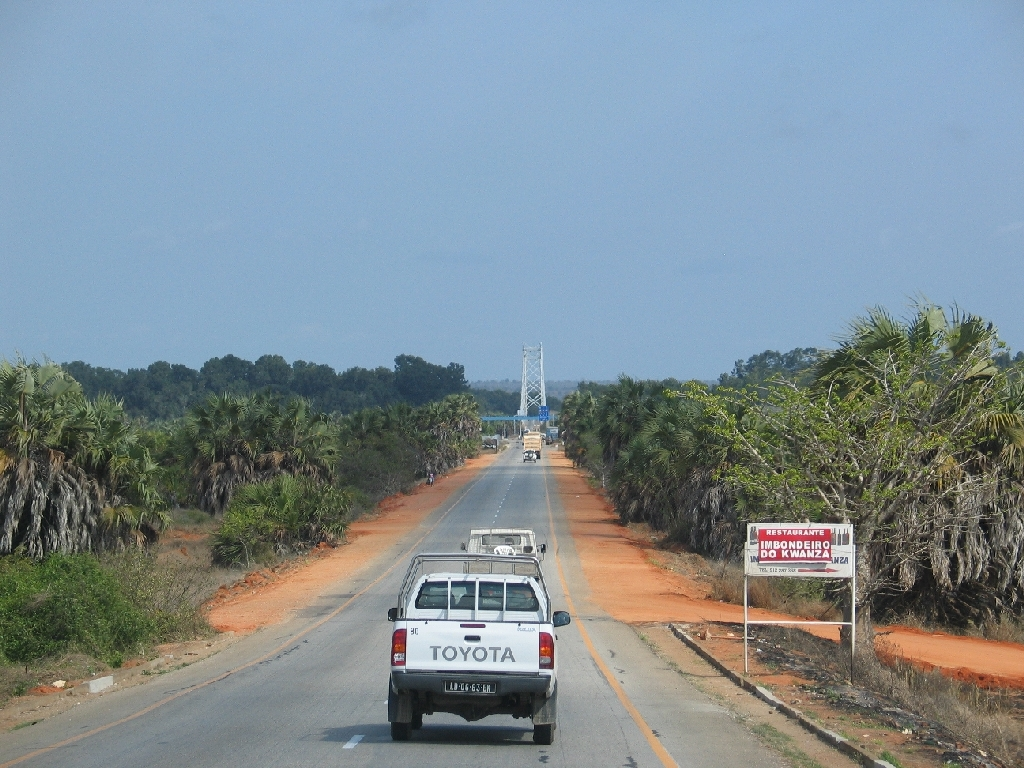
EN-100, near the bridge over the Cuanza River, in 2008.

The EN-100 traverses approximately 80 kilometers through the urban area of Luanda, Angola's capital city. North of the city, it intersects with the N225. The route through Luanda features separate lanes, with 2x2 to 2x3 lanes, and passes through the city center. The EN-100 proceeds past Luanda's port area, through the central district, and along the coast, passing through southern suburbs before rounding the Western Cape and exiting the urban area.

The EN-100 embarks on a lengthy southward journey, paralleling the coast, with varying distances to the shoreline. The road remains paved until Tômbua, featuring a modern, wide carriageway suitable for higher speeds. The EN-100 serves key coastal cities such as Lobito, Benguela, and Moçâmedes, with some sections having dual carriageways. Major roads connect these cities to inland areas. Going south, the terrain transforms into a desert landscape, especially south of Lobito, with some mountainous sections featuring slopes and bends. The dirt road approaches the Kunene River bordering Namibia, although some maps suggest a route to the southwest towards Foz do Cunene, which does not exist. Notably, there is no border crossing with Namibia in the region.

== History ==
One of the oldest roads in the country, its first section opened in the 16th century was possibly between Luanda, Ambriz, and Soyo, serving as a livestock crossing. The Portuguese Empire then focused on connecting it to Benguela from the 17th century onward, eventually reaching Moçâmedes and the Namib Desert in the 19th century. The last sections to be opened, at the end of the 19th century, were those connecting Cabinda to Massabi and the Angoio border.

However, Angola's road network remained underdeveloped and precarious during the Portuguese colonial era, with only a few paved sections, including the 400-kilometer stretch between Luanda and Sumbe, some urban areas, and a section from Moçâmedes to Tômbua in southern Angola. The Angolan Civil War further neglected or damaged the road network. Following the war's end in 2002, some sections were paved, particularly in the south, including the route to Benguela. Between 2009 and 2011, the 93-kilometer section from Moçâmedes to Tômbua was modernized. From 2010 to 2014, the road through Cabinda was fully paved to both borders, and the N'Zeto to Luanda route was also paved. Between 2010 and 2020, the road from Benguela to Moçâmedes was paved in phases, with the final sections north of Moçâmedes completed in 2020–2021. However, the upgrade remains incomplete, with some bridges still unfinished.

Between 2009 and 2017, the northern section of the EN-100, spanning N'Zeto to Soyo, was upgraded to the Autoestrada N'zeto-Soyo.

=== Upgrade in Luanda ===
Prior to 2000, the road was mostly single-lane, with a brief double-lane section near the city center. In 2002, the first grade-separated intersection was introduced, featuring a viaduct over Rua Commandante Arguelles south of the city center. From 2004 onwards, the road south of this intersection was expanded to 2x2 lanes, later extended to modern apartment districts in 2009. Between 2008 and 2012, a new 2x3 lane road was constructed along the central waterfront, known as Avenida Marginal 4 de Fevereiro. From 2010 to 2013, the northern section of Luanda was widened to 2x3 lanes. Angola's oil revenues enabled these upgrades. In 2017, a new double-lane approach road with 2x3 lanes was built northeast of the city center, allowing traffic to bypass the port area. Additionally, the 54-kilometer Fidel Castro Expressway was completed in 2010.
