= Muxima =

- Commune
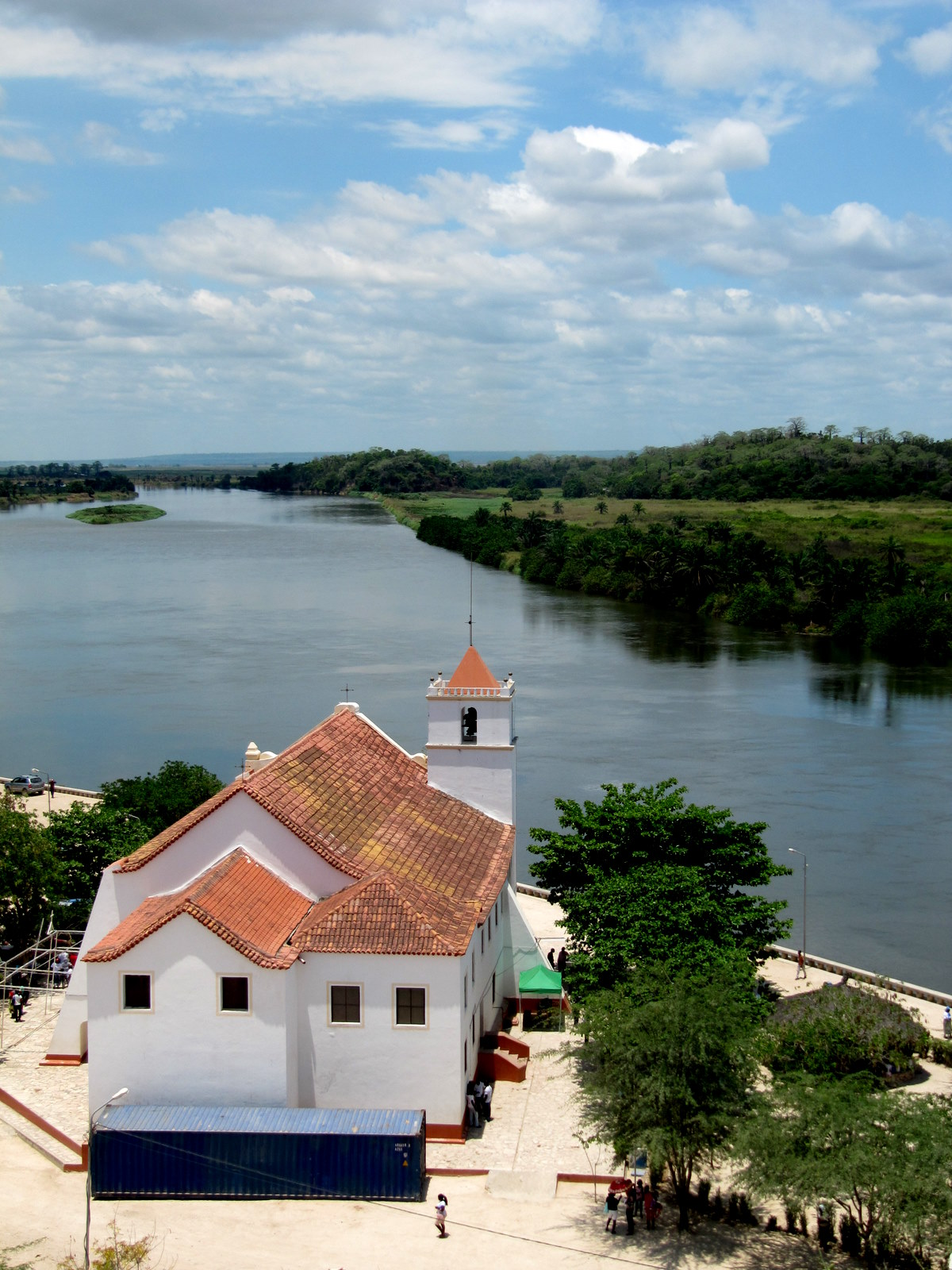
- Church of Our Lady of Conception

- Location in Angola
- Coordinates: 9°31′S 13°58′E
- Country: Angola
- Province: Icolo e Bengo
- Municipality: Quiçama

Area
  - Total: 2,670 km^{2} (1,030 sq mi)

Population (2014)
  - Total: 8,166
  - Density: 3.06/km^{2} (7.92/sq mi)
- Time zone: UTC+1 (WAT)

Muxima is a town and commune in the municipality of Quiçama, Icolo e Bengo Province, Angola. The village, located by the Kwanza River, was occupied in 1589 by the Portuguese who erected a church and the Fortress of Muxima in 1599. Muxima means "heart" in Kimbundu and is the site of a Marian shrine.

== Church ==
The church Nossa Senhora da Conceição, more well known as Nossa Senhora da Muxima, was first established in colonial Portuguese Angola in by 1599.

It became a popular pilgrimage site after an alleged Marian apparition in 1833, and now receives over 1 million pilgrims annually.

During a Mass in October 2013, an act of vandalism caused some damage that was later repaired. In April 2026, Pope Leo XIV visited the shrine to pray the rosary.
