= Catete, Ícolo e Bengo =

Catete
- Municipality
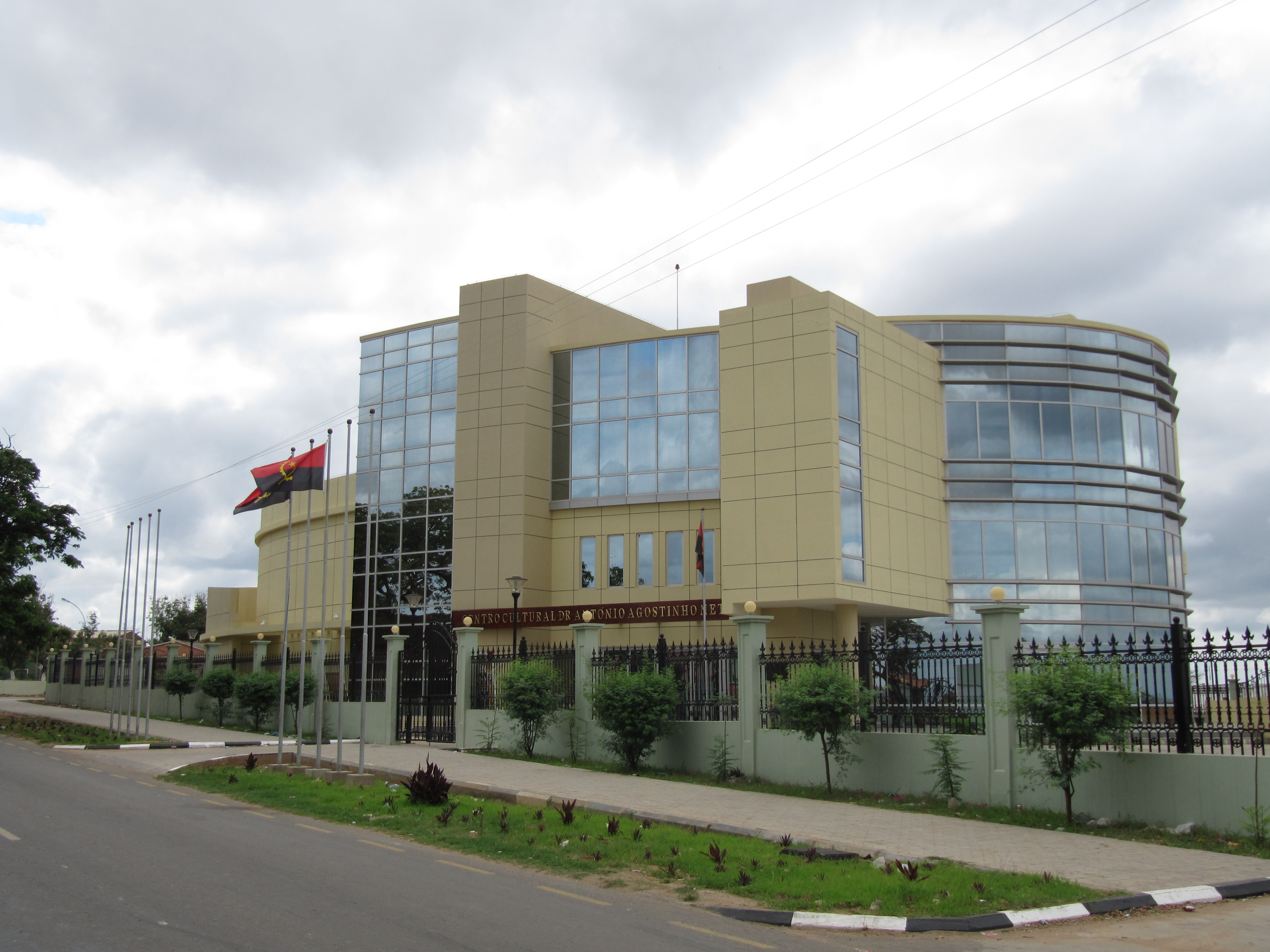
- Agostinho Neto Cultural Center

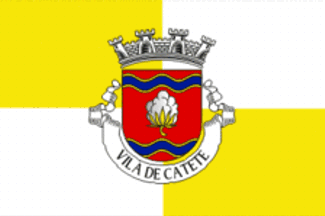
- Flag

- Location in Angola
- Coordinates: 09°06′27.8″S 13°41′19.3″E
- Country: Angola
- Province: Icolo e Bengo

Area
  - Total: 559 km^{2} (216 sq mi)

Population (2014)
  - Total: 23,284
  - Density: 41.7/km^{2} (108/sq mi)
- Time zone: UTC+1 (WAT)

Catete is a municipality in Angola. It is the capital of Icolo e Bengo Province. Catete was formerly a commune within the municipality of Ícolo e Bengo, located in Luanda Province. According to the 2014 census, Catete had a population of 23,284 inhabitants. The commune covers an area of 559 square kilometers (216 sq mi), resulting in a population density of approximately 42 inhabitants per square kilometer.

== Geography ==
The territory of Catete covers 559 square kilometers (216 sq mi). It is the capital of Icolo e Bengo Province since that province's creation in 2024. Previously, Catete had been a commune in the municipality of Ícolo e Bengo in Luanda Province. Catete lies in a region characterized by low relief, rarely exceeding 200 meters in elevation. The municipality is bounded by the Bengo River to the north and the Cuanza River to the south, both of which create fertile alluvial plains. Though no protected natural areas have been designated, the region includes ecologically valuable zones such as marsh meadows, mangroves, and riparian forests.

Catete has a tropical climate with a pronounced dry season. Temperatures range from 20 °C (68 °F) in the coldest months to around 31 °C (87 °F) in the warmest. Rainfall is concentrated in April (wettest month), while June and July are the driest. The annual precipitation averages around 456 mm across 159 rainy days. The ultraviolet index remains high for most of the year, and daylight varies between 11.5 and 12.5 hours throughout the year. The region does not observe daylight saving time.

The black soils of Catete (terras pretas de Catete) are known for their high agricultural productivity, especially for crops like cotton. It is served by a railway station on the Luanda Railways. Catete is the major graveyard for old steam locomotives on the northern line.

== Demographics ==
In the 2014 census, the municipality had a population of 23,284 inhabitants. The population of Catete was almost evenly split between men and women, with 11,731 males (49.6%) and 11,553 females (50.4%). The majority of the population fell within the working-age group (15–64 years), comprising 52% of the population (12,105 individuals). Children aged less than fifteen accounted for 43.6% (10,151), while seniors aged 65 and over made up 4.4% (1,027).

== Notable people ==
- Agostinho Neto, first President of Angola
- Deolinda Rodrigues Francisco de Almeida, Angolan nationalist

== See also ==
- Railway stations in Angola
