= List of national and state libraries =

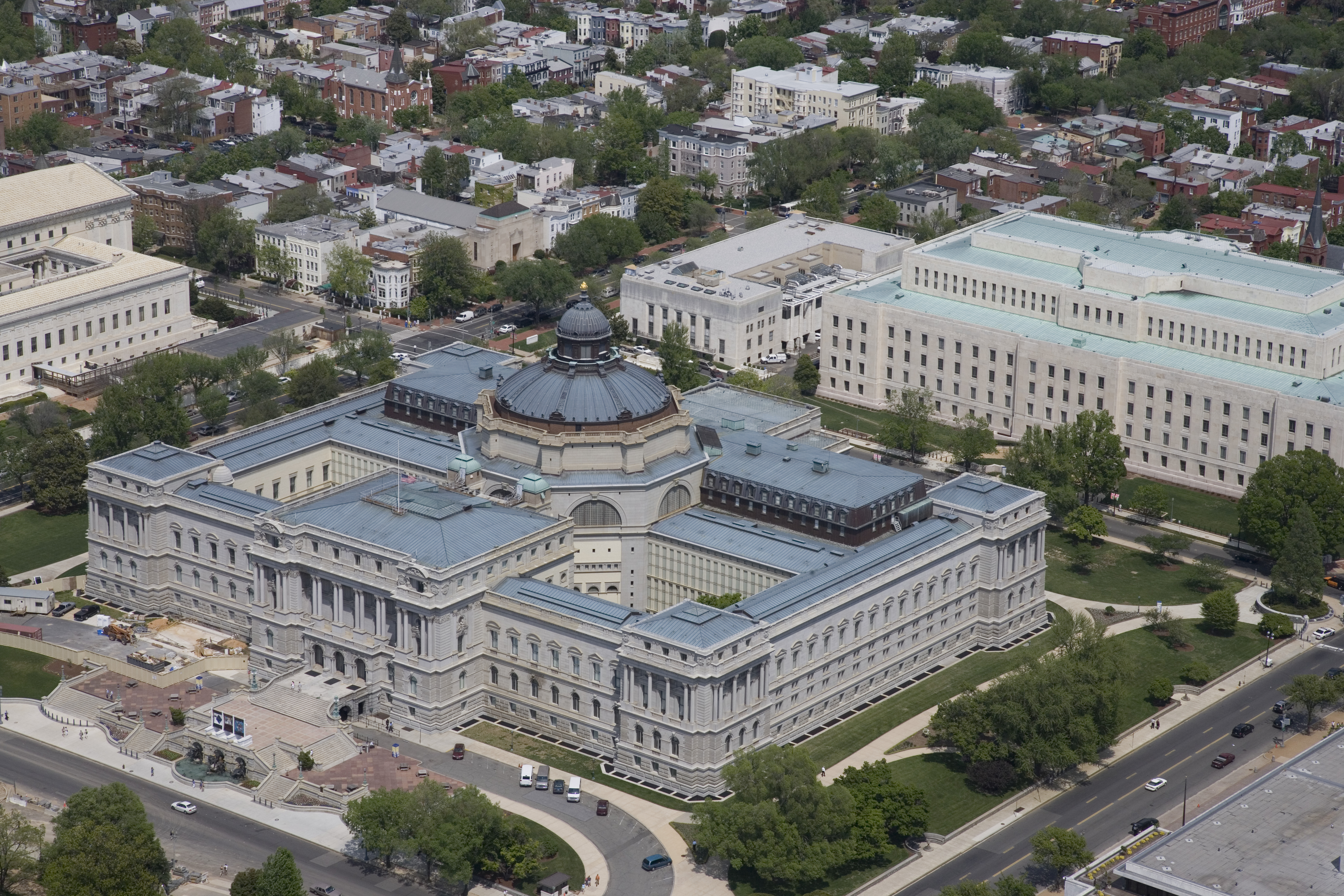
United States Library of Congress, Jefferson Building

Below is a list of national libraries.

The list below is organized alphabetically by country, according to the list of sovereign states, including, at its end, an 'other states' section for non-sovereign states. A "♦" indicates a national library of a province or state, or constituent country or dependent state. It is listed under the sovereign state which governs that entity. Sovereign states are listed even when they have no national library or when the existence and name of a national library could not yet be ascertained. Other states, constituent countries, and dependent states are listed only if they have a national library.

== National libraries ==
=== A ===
Country		Library	City	Legal deposit	Source
(Abkhazia)	Abkhazia	→ see under Other States			
(Afghanistan)	Afghanistan (Note: According to the United Nations, as of 2021, approximately 37 percent of adult Afghans can read.)	National Library of Afghanistan	Kabul		
(Åland)	Åland	→ see under Finland			
(Albania)	Albania	National Library of Albania (Biblioteka Kombëtare e Shqipërisë)	Tirana		
(Algeria)	Algeria	National Library of Algeria (Bibliothèque nationale d'Algérie – المكتبة الوطنية الجزائرية)	Algiers		
(Andorra)	Andorra	Andorra National Library (Biblioteca Nacional d'Andorra)	Andorra la Vella		
(Angola)	Angola	National Library of Angola (Biblioteca Nacional de Angola)	Luanda		
(Antigua and Barbuda)	Antigua and Barbuda	National Library of Antigua and Barbuda	St. John's		
(Argentina)	Argentina	National Library of Argentina (Biblioteca Nacional Mariano Moreno)	Buenos Aires		
(Armenia)	Armenia	National Library of Armenia (Հայաստանի ազգային գրադարան)	Yerevan		
(Aruba)	Aruba	→ see under the Netherlands			
(Australia)	Australia	National Library of Australia	Canberra	Yes	
(Austria)	Austria	Austrian National Library (Österreichische Nationalbibliothek)	Vienna		
(Azerbaijan)	Azerbaijan	Akhundov National Library (Axundov adına Azərbaycan Milli Kitabxanası, National Library of Azerbaijan)	Baku		

=== B ===
Country		Library	City	Legal deposit	Source
(The Bahamas)	Bahamas	Harry C. Moore Library (University of the Bahamas) (de facto)	Nassau		
(Bahrain)	Bahrain	Shaikh Isa bin Salman Al Khalifa National Library (المكتبة الشيخ عيسى بن سلمان الخليفة الوطنية)	Juffair		
(Bangladesh)	Bangladesh	National Library of Bangladesh (বাংলাদেশ জাতীয় গ্রন্থাগার)	Dhaka		
(Barbados)	Barbados	National Library Service of Barbados	Bridgetown		
(Belarus)	Belarus	National Library of Belarus (Нацыянальная бібліятэка Беларусі)	Minsk		
(Belgium)	Belgium	Royal Library of Belgium (Koninklijke Bibliotheek van België = Bibliothèque royale de Belgique)	Brussels	Yes	
(Belize)	Belize	National Library Service of Belize	Belize City		
(Benin)	Benin	National Library of Benin (Bibliothèque nationale du Bénin)	Porto-Novo		
(Bermuda)	Bermuda	→ see under United Kingdom			
(Bhutan)	Bhutan	National Library of Bhutan	Thimphu		
(Bolivia)	Bolivia	National Archive and Library of Bolivia (Archivo y Biblioteca Nacional de Bolivia)	Sucre		
(Bosnia and Herzegovina)	Bosnia and Herzegovina	National and University Library of Bosnia and Herzegovina (Nacionalna i univerzitetska biblioteka Bosne i Hercegovine)	Sarajevo		
(Bosnia and Herzegovina)	Bosnia and Herzegovina	National and University Library of the Republika Srpska (Народна и универзитетска библиотека Републике Српске)	Banja Luka		
(Botswana)	Botswana	National Library Service of Botswana	Gaborone		
(Brazil)	Brazil	National Library of Brazil (Fundação Biblioteca Nacional)	Rio de Janeiro	Yes	
(British Virgin Islands)	British Virgin Islands	→ see under United Kingdom			
(Brunei)	Brunei	Dewan Bahasa dan Pustaka Library (Dewan Bahasa and Pustaka Brunei Library)	Bandar Seri Begawan		
(Bulgaria)	Bulgaria	SS. Cyril and Methodius National Library (Народна Библиотека Св. Св. Кирил и Методий)	Sofia		
(Burkina Faso)	Burkina Faso	National Library of Burkina Faso (Bibliothèque nationale du Burkina Faso)	Ouagadougou		
(Myanmar)	Burma (Myanmar)	National Library of Myanmar	Yangon		
(Burundi)	Burundi	National Library of Burundi (Bibliothèque nationale du Burundi)	Bujumbura		

=== C ===
Country		Library	City	Legal deposit	Source
(Cambodia)	Cambodia	National Library of Cambodia	Phnom Penh		
(Cameroon)	Cameroon	National Library of Cameroon (Bibliothèque nationale du Cameroun)	Yaoundé		
(Canada)	Canada	Library and Archives Canada (Bibliothèque et Archives Canada)	Ottawa	Yes	
(Canada)	Canada	Canada Institute for Scientific and Technical Information (Institut canadien de l'information scientifique et technique)	Ottawa		
(Quebec)	♦ Quebec	National Library and Archives of Quebec (Bibliothèque et Archives nationales du Québec)	Montreal	Yes	
(Cape Verde)	Cape Verde	National Library of Cape Verde (Biblioteca Nacional de Cabo Verde)	Praia		
(Catalonia)	Catalonia	→ see under Spain			
(Central African Republic)	Central African Republic (Note: According to the United Nations, as of 2020, approximately 37 percent of adult Central Africans can read.)	[national library created in legislation but does not exist yet]	Bangui		
(Chad)	Chad (Note: According to the United Nations, as of 2021, approximately 27 percent of adult Chadians can read.)	National Library of Chad (Bibliothèque nationale du Tchad)	N'Djamena		
(Chile)	Chile	National Library of Chile (Biblioteca Nacional de Chile)	Santiago	Yes	
(China)	China	National Library of China (国家图书馆)	Beijing	Yes	
(Hong Kong)	♦ Hong Kong	Hong Kong Central Library (香港中央圖書館)	Hong Kong	Yes	
(Macau)	♦ Macau	Macau Central Library (澳門中央圖書館, Biblioteca Central de Macau)	Macau		
(Taiwan)	Taiwan (Republic of China)	→ see under Other states			
(Colombia)	Colombia	National Library of Colombia (Biblioteca Nacional de Colombia)	Bogotá	Yes	
(Comoros)	Comoros	National Centre for Documentation and Scientific Research (Centre National de Documentation et de Recherche Scientifique)	Moroni		
(Republic of the Congo)	Republic of the Congo	National Library of the Republic of the Congo (Bibliothèque nationale du Congo)	Brazzaville		
(Democratic Republic of the Congo)	Democratic Republic of the Congo	National Library of the Democratic Republic of Congo (Bibliothèque nationale de la République démocratique du Congo)	Kinshasa		
(Cook Islands)	Cook Islands	→ see under New Zealand			
(Costa Rica)	Costa Rica	National Library "Miguel Obregon Lizano" of Costa Rica (Biblioteca nacional "Miguel Obregón Lizano" de Costa Rica)	San José		
(Costa Rica)	Costa Rica	National Library of Health and Social Security (Biblioteca Nacional de Salud y Seguridad Social)	San José		
(Croatia)	Croatia	National and University Library in Zagreb (Nacionalna i sveučilišna knjižnica u Zagrebu)	Zagreb	Yes	
(Cuba)	Cuba	National Library José Martí (Biblioteca Nacional José Martí)	Habana		
(Cyprus)	Cyprus	Cyprus Library (Κυπριακή Βιβλιοθήκη)	Nicosia		
(Northern Cyprus)	Northern Cyprus	→ see under Other states			
(Czech Republic)	Czech Republic	National Library of the Czech Republic (Národní knihovna České republiky)	Prague	Yes	

=== D ===
Country		Library	City	Legal deposit	Source
(Denmark)	Denmark	Danish Royal Library, The National Library of Denmark and Copenhagen University Library (Det Kongelige Bibliotek)	Copenhagen	Yes	
(Denmark)	Denmark	State and University Library (Statsbiblioteket)	Aarhus	Yes	
(Faroe Islands)	♦ Faroe Islands	National Library of the Faroe Islands (Føroya landsbókasavn)	Tórshavn		
(Greenland)	♦ Greenland	Public and National Library of Greenland (Det Grønlandske Landsbibliotek = Nunatta Atuagaateqarfia)	Nuuk		
(Djibouti)	Djibouti	National Archive and Library of Djibouti (Centre national de documentation de Djibouti)	Djibouti		
(Dominica)	Dominica	National Library of Dominica	Roseau		
(Dominican Republic)	Dominican Republic	National Library Pedro Henríquez Ureña (Biblioteca Nacional Pedro Henríquez Ureña)	Santo Domingo		

=== E ===
Country		Library	City	Legal deposit	Source
(Timor-Leste)	East Timor	National Library of East Timor (Biblioteca e Arquivo Nacional de Timor-Leste)	Dili		
(Ecuador)	Ecuador	National Library of Ecuador (Biblioteca Nacional del Ecuador Eugenio Espejo)	Quito		
(Egypt)	Egypt	Egyptian National Library and Archives	Cairo		
(Egypt)	Egypt	Egyptian National Agricultural Library	Giza		
(El Salvador)	El Salvador	National Library of El Salvador (Biblioteca Nacional Francisco Gavidia)	San Salvador		
(Equatorial Guinea)	Equatorial Guinea	National Library of Equatorial Guinea (Biblioteca Nacional de Guinea Ecuatorial)	Malabo		
(Eritrea)	Eritrea	Research and Documentation Center of Eritrea	Asmara		
(Estonia)	Estonia	National Library of Estonia (Eesti Rahvusraamatukogu)	Tallinn	Yes	
(Eswatini)	Eswatini	Eswatini National Library Service (Mbabane Public Library - ENLS)	Mbabane		
(Ethiopia)	Ethiopia	National Archives and Library of Ethiopia	Addis Ababa		

=== F ===
Country		Library	City	Legal deposit	Source
(Faroe Islands)	Faroe Islands	→ see under Denmark			
(Fiji)	Fiji	Library Services of Fiji	Suva		
(Finland)	Finland	National Library of Finland (Kansalliskirjasto = Nationalbibliotek)	Helsinki		
(Åland)	♦ Åland	Mariehamn City Library (Mariehamns stadsbibliotek)	Mariehamn		
(France)	France	National Library of France (Bibliothèque nationale de France)	Paris		

=== G ===
Country		Library	City	Legal deposit	Source
(Gabon)	Gabon	National Library of Gabon (Direction Générale des Archives Nationales, de la Bibliothèque Nationale et de la Documentation Gabonaise, DGABD)	Libreville		
(The Gambia)	The Gambia	National Library of The Gambia	Banjul		
(Georgia (country))	Georgia	National Parliamentary Library of Georgia	Tbilisi		
(Germany)	Germany	German National Library (Deutsche Nationalbibliothek)	Frankfurt a.M. and Leipzig	Yes	
(Germany)	Germany	German National Library of Economics (Deutsche Zentralbibliothek für Wirtschaftswissenschaften)	Kiel and Hamburg		
(Germany)	Germany	German National Library of Medicine (Deutsche Zentralbibliothek für Medizin)	Cologne and Bonn		
(Germany)	Germany	German National Library of Science and Technology (Technische Informationsbibliothek)	Hanover	Yes	
(Ghana)	Ghana	George Padmore Research Library (division of Ghana Library Authority)	Accra		
(Greece)	Greece	National Library of Greece (Εθνική Βιβλιοθήκη της Ελλάδος)	Athens		
(Greenland)	Greenland	→ see under Denmark			
(Grenada)	Grenada	National Library and Archives of Grenada (closed since 2011)	St. George's		
(Guatemala)	Guatemala	National Library of Guatemala (Biblioteca Nacional de Guatemala "Luis Cardoza y Aragón")	Guatemala City		
(Guinea)	Guinea	National Library of Guinea (Bibliothèque nationale de Guinée)	Conakry		
(Guinea-Bissau)	Guinea-Bissau	Public Library of the INEP (Biblioteca Pública do Instituto Nacional de Estudos e Pesquisa, INEP)	Bissau		
(Guyana)	Guyana	National Library of Guyana	Georgetown		

=== H ===
Country		Library	City	Legal deposit	Source
(Haiti)	Haiti	National Library of Haiti (Bibliothèque nationale d'Haïti)	Port-au-Prince		
(Honduras)	Honduras	Juan Ramón Molina National Library (Biblioteca Nacional Juan Ramón Molina)	Tegucigalpa		
(Hong Kong)	Hong Kong	→ see under People's Republic of China			
(Hungary)	Hungary	National Széchényi Library (Országos Széchényi Könyvtár)	Budapest		
(Hungary)	Hungary	University of Debrecen Library (Debreceni Egyetemi és Nemzeti Könyvtár)	Debrecen		

=== I ===
Country		Library	City	Legal deposit	Source
(Iceland)	Iceland	National and University Library of Iceland (Landsbókasafn Íslands Háskólabókasafn)	Reykjavík	Yes	
(India)	India	National Library of India	Kolkata	Yes	
(Indonesia)	Indonesia	National Library of Indonesia (Perpustakaan Nasional Republik Indonesia)	Central Jakarta	Yes	
(Iran)	Iran	National Library of Iran (Ketabkhane-ye Melli-ye Iran)	Tehran	Yes	
(Iran)	Iran	Malek National Library (Ketabkhane-ye Melli-ye Malek)	Tehran		
(Iraq)	Iraq	Iraq National Library and Archive	Baghdad		
(Republic of Ireland)	Ireland	National Library of Ireland = Leabharlann Náisiúnta na hÉireann	Dublin		
(Isle of Man)	Isle of Man	→ see under United Kingdom			
(Israel)	Israel	National Library of Israel (הספרייה הלאומית)	Jerusalem	Yes	
(Italy)	Italy	National Central Library (Florence) (Biblioteca Nazionale Centrale Firenze)	Florence		
(Italy)	Italy	National Central Library (Rome) (Biblioteca Nazionale Centrale di Roma)	Rome		
(Italy)	Italy	Biblioteca Nazionale Vittorio Emanuele III (Biblioteca Nazionale di Napoli)	Naples		
(Ivory Coast)	Ivory Coast	National Library of Ivory Coast (Bibliothèque nationale de Côte d'Ivoire)	Abidjan		

=== J ===
Country		Library	City	Legal deposit	Source
(Jamaica)	Jamaica	National Library of Jamaica	Kingston	Yes	
(Japan)	Japan	National Diet Library	Tokyo and Kyoto (Kansai-kan)	Yes	
(Jersey)	Jersey	→ see under United Kingdom			
(Jordan)	Jordan	National Library of Jordan	Amman		

=== K ===
Country		Library	City	Legal deposit	Source
(Kazakhstan)	Kazakhstan	National Library of Kazakhstan (Қазақстан Республикасының Ұлттық Кітапханасы = Национальная библиотека Республики Казахстан)	Almaty		
(Kenya)	Kenya	National Library Service of Kenya	Nairobi	Yes	
(Kiribati)	Kiribati	Kiribati National Library and Archives	Bairiki		
(North Korea)	North Korea	Grand People's Study House	Pyongyang		
(South Korea)	South Korea	National Library of Korea (국립중앙도서관)	Seoul		
(South Korea)	South Korea	National Digital Library of Korea	Seoul		
(South Korea)	South Korea	National Library for Children and Young Adults (국립어린이청소년도서관)	Seoul		
(Kosovo)	Kosovo	→ see under Other states			
(Kuwait)	Kuwait	National Library of Kuwait	Kuwait		
(Kyrgyzstan)	Kyrgyzstan	National Library of the Kyrgyz Republic (Кыргыз Республикасынын Улуттук Китепканасы)	Bishkek		

=== L ===
Country		Library	City	Legal deposit	Source
(Laos)	Laos	National Library of Laos	Vientiane		
(Latvia)	Latvia	National Library of Latvia (Latvijas Nacionālā bibliotēka)	Riga		
(Lebanon)	Lebanon	Lebanon National Library (المكتبة الو طنية = Bibliothèque Nationale du Liban)	Beirut		
(Lesotho)	Lesotho	Lesotho National Library Services (Libraries in Lesotho)	Maseru		
(Liberia)	Liberia	National Public Library of Liberia (Liberian kansalliskirjasto)	Monrovia		
(Libya)	Libya	National Library of Libya	Benghazi		
(Liechtenstein)	Liechtenstein	Liechtenstein State Library (Liechtensteinische Landesbibliothek)	Vaduz		
(Lithuania)	Lithuania	Martynas Mažvydas National Library of Lithuania (Lietuvos Nacionalinė Martyno Mažvydo biblioteka)	Vilnius		
(Luxembourg)	Luxembourg	National Library of Luxembourg (Bibliothèque nationale de Luxembourg = Lëtzebuerger Nationalbibliothéik = Nationalbibliothek Luxemburg)	Luxembourg		

=== M ===
Country		Library	City	Legal deposit	Source
(Macau)	Macau	→ see under People's Republic of China			
(North Macedonia)	North Macedonia	National and University Library "St. Kliment of Ohrid" (Национална и универзитетска библиотека „Св. Климент Охридски")	Skopje		
(Madagascar)	Madagascar	National Library of Madagascar (Bibliothèque nationale de Madagascar)	Antananarivo		
(Malawi)	Malawi	National Library Service of Malawi	Lilongwe		
(Malaysia)	Malaysia	National Library of Malaysia (Perpustakaan Negara Malaysia)	Kuala Lumpur	Yes	
(Maldives)	Maldives	National Library of Maldives	Galolhu Malé		
(Mali)	Mali (Note: According to the United Nations, as of 2020, approximately 31 percent of adult Malians can read.)	National Library of Mali (Direction nationale des Bibliothèques et de la Documentation)	Bamako		
(Malta)	Malta	National Library of Malta	Valletta		
(Marshall Islands)	Marshall Islands	Alele Museum & Public Library	Majuro		
(Mauritania)	Mauritania	National Library of Mauritania (Bibliothèque nationale de Mauritanie)	Nouakchott		
(Mauritius)	Mauritius	National Library of Mauritius	Port Louis		
(Mexico)	Mexico	National Library of Mexico (Biblioteca Nacional de México)	Mexico City	Yes	
(Mexico)	Mexico	National Newspaper and Periodicals Library of Mexico (Hemeroteca Nacional de México)	Mexico City		
(Federated States of Micronesia)	Federated States of Micronesia	(List of libraries in the Federated States of Micronesia)	Palikir		
(Moldova)	Moldova	National Library of Moldova (Biblioteca Naţională a Republicii Moldova)	Chișinău		
(Monaco)	Monaco	Louis Notari Library (Bibliothèque Louis Notari)	Monaco	Yes	
(Mongolia)	Mongolia	National Library of Mongolia	Ulaanbaatar		
(Montenegro)	Montenegro	National Library of Montenegro (Национална библиотека Црне Горе "Ђурђе Црнојевић")	Cetinje		
(Morocco)	Morocco	National Library of the Kingdom of Morocco ( المكتبة الوطنية للمملكة المغربية)	Rabat and Tétouan		
(Mozambique)	Mozambique	National Library of Mozambique (Biblioteca Nacional de Moçambique)	Maputo		

=== N ===
Country		Library	City	Legal deposit	Source
(Namibia)	Namibia	National Library of Namibia	Windhoek		
(Nauru)	Nauru				
(Nepal)	Nepal	Nepal National Library	Harihar Bhawan, Lalitpur		
(Netherlands)	Netherlands	Royal Library of the Netherlands (Koninklijke Bibliotheek, lit. "Royal Library")	The Hague		
(Aruba)	♦ Aruba	National Library of Aruba (Biblioteca Nacional Aruba)	Oranjestad		
(New Zealand)	New Zealand	National Library of New Zealand (Te Puna Mātauranga o Aotearoa)	Wellington		
(Cook Islands)	♦ Cook Islands	National Library of the Cook Islands; Cook Islands Library and Museum Society	Rarotonga		
(Nicaragua)	Nicaragua	National Library of Nicaragua Rubén Darío (Biblioteca Nacional de Nicaragua Rubén Darío)	Managua		
(Nicaragua)	Nicaragua	National Health Library (Biblioteca Nacional de Salud)	Managua		
(Niger)	Niger (Note: According to the United Nations, as of 2021, approximately 37 percent of adult Nigeriens can read.)	Direction of the National Archives of Niger (Direction des Archives nationales du Niger)	Niamey		
(Nigeria)	Nigeria	National Library of Nigeria	Lagos		
	North...	→ see under the second word			
(Norway)	Norway	National Library of Norway (Nasjonalbiblioteket)	Oslo and Mo i Rana		

=== O ===
Country		Library	City	Legal deposit	Source
(Oman)	Oman	Sultan Qaboos University Library	Muscat		

=== P ===
Country		Library	City	Legal deposit	Source
(Pakistan)	Pakistan	National Library of Pakistan	Islamabad		
(Palau)	Palau	Palau Community College Library	Koror		
(Palestine)	Palestine	Palestinian National Library (المكتبة الوطنية الفلسطينية)	Ramallah	Yes	
(Panama)	Panama	National Library of Panama (Biblioteca Nacional de Panamá)	Panama City		
(Papua New Guinea)	Papua New Guinea	National Library of Papua New Guinea	Port Moresby		
(Paraguay)	Paraguay	National Library of Paraguay (Biblioteca Nacional del Paraguay)	Asunción		
(Paraguay)	Paraguay	National Library of Agriculture (Paraguay) (Biblioteca Nacional de Agricultura)	Asunción		
(Peru)	Peru	National Library of Peru (Biblioteca Nacional del Perú)	Lima	Yes	
(Philippines)	Philippines	National Library of the Philippines (Pambansang Aklatan ng Pilipinas)	Manila	Yes	
(Poland)	Poland	National Library of Poland (Biblioteka Narodowa)	Warsaw	Yes	
(Poland)	Poland	Jagiellonian Library (Biblioteka Jagiellońska)	Kraków	Yes	
(Portugal)	Portugal	Biblioteca Nacional de Portugal (National Library of Portugal)	Lisbon		

=== Q ===
Country		Library	City	Legal deposit	Source
(Qatar)	Qatar	Qatar National Library	Doha		
(Quebec)	Quebec	→ see under Canada			

=== R ===
Country		Library	City	Legal deposit	Source
(Romania)	Romania	National Library of Romania (Biblioteca Națională a României)	Bucharest		
(Russia)	Russian Federation	Russian State Library (Российская Государственная Библиотека)	Moscow		
(Russia)	Russian Federation	National Library of Russia (Российская Национальная Библиотека)	Saint Petersburg		
(Russia)	Russian Federation	Boris Yeltsin Presidential Library (Президентская библиотека имени Б.Н.Ельцина)	Saint Petersburg		
(Russia)	Bashkortostan	Akhmet-Zaki Validi National Library of the Republic of Bashkortostan (Национальная библиотека имени Ахмет-Заки Валиди)	Ufa		
(Russia)	Chechnya	National Library of the Chechen Republic (Национальная библиотека Чеченской Республики)	Grozny		
(Russia)	Chuvashia	National Library of the Chuvash Republic (Национальная библиотека Чувашской Республики)	Cheboksary		
(Russia)	Dagestan	National Library of the Republic of Dagestan (Национальная библиотека Республики Дагестан)	Makhachkala		
(Russia)	Kalmykia	National Library of Kalmykia (Национальная библиотека Калмыкии)	Elista		
(Russia)	Republic of Karelia	National Library of the Republic of Karelia (Национальная библиотека Республики Карелия)	Petrozavodsk		
(Russia)	Khakassia	National Library of the Republic of Khakassia (Национальная библиотека Республики Хакасия)	Abakan		
(Russia)	Komi Republic	National Library of the Komi Republic (Национальная библиотека Республики Коми)	Syktyvkar		
(Russia)	Mari El	S. G. Chavaine National Library (Национальная библиотека имени С. Г. Чавайна)	Yoshkar-Ola		
(Russia)	Mordovia	National Library of the Republic of Mordovia (Национальная библиотека имени А. С. Пушкина Республики Мордовия)	Saransk		
(Russia)	North Ossetia–Alania	National Scientific Library of the Republic of North Ossetia–Alania (Национальная научная библиотека Республики Северная Осетия — Алания)	Vladikavkaz		
(Russia)	(Sakha Republic) Sakha	National Library of the Republic of Sakha (Yakutia) (Национальная библиотека Республики Саха (Якутия))	Yakutsk		
(Russia)	Tatarstan	National Library of the Republic of Tatarstan (Татарстан Республикасы Милли китапханәсендә = Национальная Библиотека Республики Татарстан)	Kazan		
(Russia)	Tuva	National Library of the Republic of Tyva (Национальная библиотека Республики Тыва им. А. С. Пушкина)	Kyzyl		
(Russia)	Udmurtia	National Library of the Udmurt Republic (Национальная библиотека Удмуртской Республики)	Izhevsk		
(Rwanda)	Rwanda	National Library of Rwanda (Bibliothèque nationale du Rwanda)	Kigali		

=== S ===
Country		Library	City	Legal deposit	Source
(Saint Kitts and Nevis)	Saint Kitts and Nevis	Charles A. Halbert Public Library	Basseterre		
(Saint Lucia)	Saint Lucia	Central Library of Saint Lucia	Castries		
(Saint Vincent and the Grenadines)	Saint Vincent and the Grenadines	Kingstown Public Library	Kingstown		
(Samoa)	Samoa	Samoa Public Library (Nelson Memorial Public Library)	Apia		
(San Marino)	San Marino	National Library and Book Patrimony (Biblioteca di Stato e Beni Librari)	San Marino		
(São Tomé and Príncipe)	São Tomé and Príncipe	National Library of São Tomé and Príncipe (Biblioteca Nacional de São Tomé e Príncipe)	São Tomé	Yes	
(Saudi Arabia)	Saudi Arabia	King Fahad National Library (مكٺبة الملك فهد الوطنية)	Riyadh		
(Scotland)	Scotland	→ see under United Kingdom			
(Senegal)	Senegal	National Library of Senegal (Bibliothèque Nationale du Sénégal, Bibliothèque des Archives nationales du Sénégal)	Dakar		
(Serbia)	Serbia	National Library of Serbia (Народна библиотека Србије)	Belgrade	Yes	
(Seychelles)	Seychelles	National Library of Seychelles	Mahé		
(Sierra Leone)	Sierra Leone	Sierra Leone Library Board	Freetown		
(Singapore)	Singapore	National Library, Singapore (Limited to Lee Kong Chian Reference Library, PublicationSG, and reference section of Regional Libraries / Public Libraries)	Singapore		
(Slovakia)	Slovakia	Slovak National Library (Slovenská národná knižnica)	Martin		
(Slovenia)	Slovenia	National and University Library of Slovenia (Narodna in univerzitetna knjižnica, NUK)	Ljubljana		
(Solomon Islands)	Solomon Islands	National Library Service of the Solomon Islands	Honiara		
(Somalia)	Somalia	National Library of Somalia	Mogadishu		
	South...	→ see under the second word, with the two exceptions below			
(South Africa)	South Africa	National Library of South Africa (Nasionale Biblioteek van Suid Afrika)	Pretoria and Cape Town		
(South Sudan)	South Sudan (Note: According to the United Nations, as of 2018, approximately 35 percent of adult South Sudanese can read.)	[No national library]			
(Spain)	Spain	Biblioteca Nacional de España [National Library of Spain]	Madrid		
(Catalonia)	♦ Catalonia	Library of Catalonia (Biblioteca de Catalunya)	Barcelona		
(Sri Lanka)	Sri Lanka	National Library of Sri Lanka	Colombo		
(Republika Srpska)	Republika Srpska	→ see under Bosnia and Herzegovina			
(Sudan)	Sudan	Sudan Library	Khartoum		
(Suriname)	Suriname	[No national library, but database available]			
(Sweden)	Sweden	National Library of Sweden (Kungliga biblioteket)	Stockholm	Yes	
(Switzerland)	Switzerland	Swiss National Library (Schweizerische Nationalbibliothek = Bibliothèque nationale suisse = Biblioteca nazionale svizzera = Biblioteca naziunala svizra)	Bern		
(Syria)	Syria	National Library of Syria (مكتبة الوطنية)	Damascus		

=== T ===
Country		Library	City	Legal deposit	Source
(Taiwan)	Taiwan (Republic of China)	→ see under Other states			
(Tajikistan)	Tajikistan	National Library of Tajikistan (Национальная библиотека Таджикистана)	Dushanbe		
(Tanzania)	Tanzania	National Central Library / Tanzania Library Services Board (Shirika la Huduma za Maktaba Tanzania)	Dar es Salaam		
(Tatarstan)	Tatarstan	→ see under Russia			
(Thailand)	Thailand	National Library of Thailand (หอสมุดแห่งชาติ)	Bangkok		
(Togo)	Togo	National Library of Togo (Bibliothèque nationale du Togo)	Lomé		
(Tonga)	Tonga	[No national library]			
(Trinidad and Tobago)	Trinidad and Tobago	National Library and Information System The Heritage Library	Port of Spain		
(Tunisia)	Tunisia	National Library of Tunisia (Bibliothèque nationale de Tunisie, المكتبة الوطنية التونسية)	Tunis		
(Turkey)	Turkey	National Library of Turkey (Milli Kütüphane)	Ankara		
(Turkey)	Turkey	National Library of İzmir (İzmir Milli Kütüphanesi)	İzmir		
(Turkmenistan)	Turkmenistan	State Library of Turkmenistan	Ashgabat		
(Tuvalu)	Tuvalu	Tuvalu National Library and Archives	Funafuti		

=== U ===
Country		Library	City	Legal deposit	Source
(Uganda)	Uganda	National Library of Uganda	Kampala		
(Ukraine)	Ukraine	Vernadsky National Library of Ukraine (Національна бібліотека України імені В.І. Вернадського)	Kyiv		
(United Arab Emirates)	United Arab Emirates	Cultural Foundation National Library	Abu Dhabi		
(United Kingdom)	United Kingdom ♦ England	British Library	London and Boston Spa (Wetherby)	Yes	
(United Kingdom)	♦ Scotland	National Library of Scotland	Edinburgh	Yes	
(United Kingdom)	♦ Wales	National Library of Wales (Llyfrgell Genedlaethol Cymru)	Aberystwyth	Yes	
(United Kingdom)	♦ Bermuda	Bermuda National Library	Hamilton		
(United Kingdom)	(British Virgin Islands) ♦ Virgin Islands, British	Library Services Department	Road Town		
(United Kingdom)	♦ Isle of Man	National Library and Archives (Manx National Heritage)	Douglas		
(United Kingdom)	♦ Jersey	Jersey Library	Saint Helier		
(United States)	United States	Library of Congress (de facto)	Washington, D.C.	Yes	
(United States)	United States	National Library of Education	Washington, D.C.		
(United States)	United States	National Transportation Library	Washington, D.C.		
(United States)	United States	Treasury Library	Washington, D.C.		
(United States)	United States	United States National Library of Medicine	Bethesda		
(United States)	United States	United States National Agricultural Library	Beltsville		
(Uruguay)	Uruguay	Biblioteca Nacional de Uruguay [National Library of Uruguay]	Montevideo		
(Uzbekistan)	Uzbekistan	National Library of Uzbekistan	Tashkent		

=== V ===
Country		Library	City	Legal deposit	Source
(Vanuatu)	Vanuatu	National Library of Vanuatu	Port Vila		
(Vatican City)	Vatican City	Vatican Library (Biblioteca Apostolica Vaticana)	Vatican City		
(Venezuela)	Venezuela	National Library of Venezuela (Biblioteca Nacional de Venezuela)	Caracas		
(Vietnam)	Vietnam	National Library of Vietnam (Thư Viện Quốc Gia Việt Nam)	Hanoi	Yes	

=== W ===
Country		Library	City	Legal deposit	Source
(Wales)	Wales	→ see under United Kingdom			

=== Y ===
Country		Library	City	Legal deposit	Source
(Yemen)	Republic of Yemen	National Library of Yemen	Aden		

=== Z ===
Country		Library	City	Legal deposit	Source
(Zambia)	Zambia	Zambia Library Service	Lusaka		
(Zimbabwe)	Zimbabwe	National Archives of Zimbabwe Library	Harare		
(Zimbabwe)	Zimbabwe	National Library of Zimbabwe	Bulawayo		

=== Other states ===
Country		Library	City	Source
(Abkhazia)	Abkhazia	Национальная библиотека Республики Абхазия	Sukhumi	
(Kosovo)	Kosovo	National Library of Kosovo (Biblioteka Kombëtare e Kosovës)	Pristina	
(Northern Cyprus)	Northern Cyprus	National Library of Northern Cyprus (Millî Kütüphane)	North Nicosia	
(Somaliland)	Somaliland	National Library of Somaliland	Hargeisa	
(Taiwan)	Taiwan (Republic of China)	National Central Library (國家圖書館)	Taipei	

== State libraries ==
A state library is established by a state to serve as the preeminent repository of information for that region.

=== Australia ===
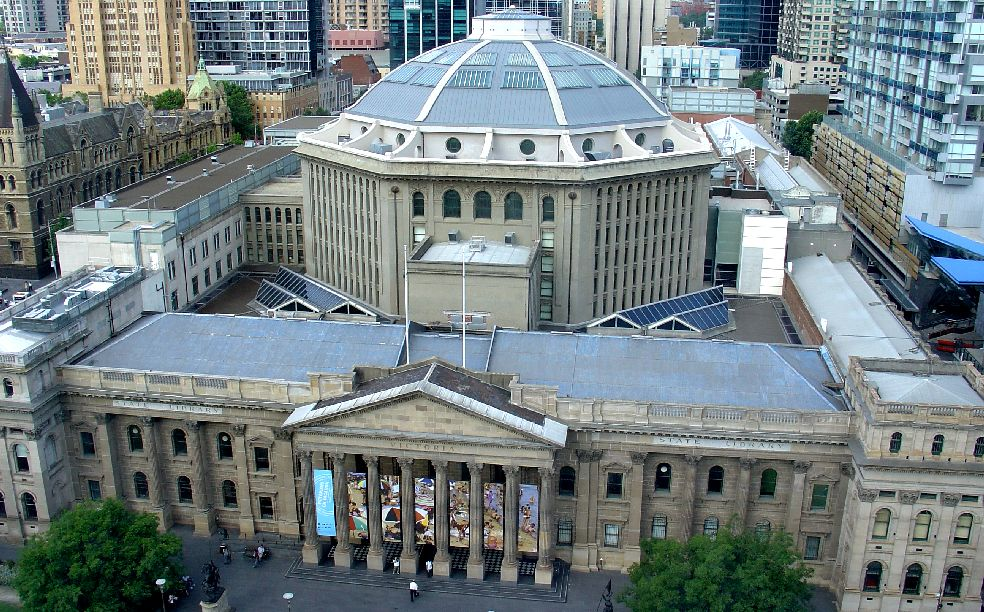
The State Library Victoria

- ACT Heritage Library
- Library & Archives NT
- State Library of New South Wales
- State Library of Queensland
- State Library of South Australia
- State Library of Tasmania
- State Library Victoria
- State Library of Western Australia

=== China ===
==== Mainland ====
- Capital Library of China
- Tianjin Library
- Hebei Library
- Shanxi Library
- Inner Mongolia Library
- Liaoning Provincial Library
- Jilin Province Library
- Heilongjiang Provincial Library
- Shanghai Library
- Shanghai Children's Library
- Nanjing Library
- Zhejiang Library
- Anhui Provincial Library
- Fujian Provincial Library
- Jiangxi Provincial Library
- Shandong Library
- Henan Provincial Library
- Hubei Provincial Library
- Hunan Library
- Hunan Provincial Library of Juveniles and Children
- Sun Yat-sen Library of Guangdong Province
- Library of Guangxi Zhuang Autonomous Region
- Guangxi Guilin Library
- Hainan Library
- Chongqing Library
- Chongqing Children's Library
- Sichuan Provincial Library
- Guizhou Provincial Library
- Yunnan Provincial Library
- Tibet Library
- Shaanxi Library
- Gansu Provincial Library
- Qinghai Library
- Ningxia Library
- Xinjiang Library

==== Hong Kong ====
- Hong Kong Central Library

==== Macau ====
- Macau Central Library

=== Germany ===
- Bavarian State Library, Munich
- Berlin Central and Regional Library
- Göttingen State and University Library
- Hessian State Library, Wiesbaden
- Saxon State and University Library Dresden
- Württembergische Landesbibliothek, Stuttgart

=== India ===
- Goa State Central Library
- Harekrushna Mahtab State Library
- Nagaland State Library
- North Bengal State Library
- State Central Library, Hyderabad
- State Central Library, Kerala

=== Spain ===
Autonomous communities libraries

- Andalusia Library
- Aragon Library
- Asturias Library
- Central Library of Cantabria
- Castile and Leon Library
- Castile-La Mancha Library
- Library of Catalonia
- Extremadura Library
- Library of Galicia
- La Rioja Library
- Madrid Regional Library
- Murcia Regional Library
- Navarre Library
- Valencian Library

=== Switzerland ===
The member states of the Swiss Confederation are the 26 cantons of Switzerland. The cantonal libraries (German: Kantonsbibliothek, French: Bibliothèque cantonale, Italian: Biblioteca cantonale, Romansh: Biblioteca chantunala) are:

- Aargau: Aargauer Kantonsbibliothek
- Appenzell Ausserrhoden: Kantonsbibliothek Appenzell Ausserrhoden
- Appenzell Innerrhoden: Innerrhodische Kantonsbibliothek
- Basel-Landschaft: Kantonsbibliothek Baselland
- Basel-Stadt: Basel University Library (university and cantonal library)
- Bern: Bibliothek Münstergasse (formerly Zentralbibliothek Bern, Stadt- und Universitätsbibliothek Bern)
- Fribourg: Bibliothèque cantonale et universitaire de Fribourg
- Geneva: Bibliothèque de Genève
- Glarus: Glarner Landesbibliothek
- Grisons: Kantonsbibliothek Graubünden / Biblioteca chantunala dal Grischun / Biblioteca cantonale dei Grigioni
- Jura: Bibliothèque cantonale jurassienne
- Luzern: Zentral- und Hochschulbibliothek Luzern (university and cantonal library)
- Neuchâtel: Bibliothèque publique et universitaire de Neuchâtel
- Nidwalden: Kantonsbibliothek Nidwalden
- Obwalden: Kantonsbibliothek Obwalden
- Schaffhausen: Stadtbibliothek Schaffhausen (city and cantonal library)
- Schwyz: Kantonsbibliothek Schwyz
- Solothurn: Zentralbibliothek Solothurn (city and cantonal library)
- St. Gallen: Kantonsbibliothek St. Gallen
- Ticino: four libraries, Biblioteca cantonale di Bellinzona, Biblioteca cantonale di Locarno, Biblioteca cantonale di Lugano, Biblioteca cantonale e del Liceo di Mendrisio
- Thurgau: Kantonsbibliothek Thurgau
- Uri: Kantonsbibliothek Uri
- Valais: Médiathèque Valais / Mediathek Wallis
- Vaud: Cantonal and University Library of Lausanne
- Zug: Bibliothek Zug
- Zürich: Zentralbibliothek Zürich (city, cantonal, and university library)

== See also ==
- European Library
- List of libraries
- List of libraries by country
- List of national archives
- List of U.S. state library associations
- Staatsbibliothek
