= NLA =

NLA may refer to:

== Organizations ==
=== Libraries ===
==== Library associations ====
- Nebraska Library Association
- Nevada Library Association

==== National libraries ====
- National Library of Afghanistan, based in Kabul University prior to its destruction in a civil war.
- National Library of Agriculture, more accurately known as the United States National Agricultural Library
- National Library of Albania
- National Library of Aleppo
- National Library of Algeria
- National Library of Andorra, more accurately known as the Andorra National Library
- National Library of Angola
- National Library of Argentina, more accurately known as the Mariano Moreno National Library of the Argentine Republic
- National Library of Armenia
- National Library of Aruba
- National Library of Australia
- National Library of Austria, more accurately known as the Austrian National Library
- National Library of Azerbaijan

=== Other organizations ===
- National Language Authority, a regulatory institution of Urdu language in Pakistan
- National League A, the premier ice hockey league in Switzerland
- National Leather Association International, a BDSM organization based in the United States
- National Lipid Association, an American association of healthcare providers dedicated to improve lipid management in clinical medicine
- Newspaper Licensing Agency, a newspaper licensing organization in the United Kingdom
- New London Architecture, a resource and forum for London's built environment

== Science and technology ==
- Network Level Authentication, in computing, a user authorizing technology
- New Large Airplane, a defunct airplane project
- Numerical linear algebra, the study of algorithms for performing linear algebra computations

== Airports ==
- NLA, the IATA code for Simon Mwansa Kapwepwe International Airport in Ndola, Zambia

== See also ==
- National Library of Antigua and Barbuda, more accurately known as the Antigua Public Library
- National Liberation Army (disambiguation)
