= National Library of Timor-Leste =

National library of East Timor

Coordinates: 8.5522°S 125.5614°E

National Library of East Timor Biblioteca Nacional de Timor-Leste Biblioteka Nasionál no Arkivu Timor-Leste nian
- Location: Dili, East Timor
- Type: National library
- Established: 2009 (17 years ago)
- Reference to legal mandate: Resolução do Governo n.º 24/2009 de 18 de novembro de 2009

Collection
- Size: 2,500

Other information
- Director: João Fátima da Cruz
- Employees: 10

The National Library of East Timor is the national library and the national archive of East Timor. Its building is under construction since 2011 in Ai-Tarak Laran, a quarter in the Suco of Kampung Alur in the Dom Aleixo Subdistrict of the country's capital Dili.

The institution was created with a governmental resolution in 2009. It is slowly building a Library catalog mainly with international donations. In 2014, the catalog consisted in 2,500 items donated by the National Library of Portugal.

Groundbreaking for the library happened in 2017, while construction began in 2022.

== See also ==
- List of national libraries
