= National Library of Kuwait =

National Library of Kuwait مكتبة الكويت الوطنية
- 29°22′30″N 47°58′7″E
- Location: Kuwait City, Kuwait
- Established: 1923 (103 years ago)

Collection
- Size: 465,000 books, 1,000,000 Manuscript, and 55,000 recordings.

Other information
- Director: Mr. Kamel Suleiman Albdul Jalil
- Website: https://www.nlk.gov.kw/

The National Library of Kuwait is the national library and legal deposit and copyright library for Kuwait. It was founded in 1923 through the efforts of several Kuwaiti writers, and received its collection from the library of the Kuwaiti Charitable Society, which was founded in 1913.

In 1994, Amiri Decree No. 52/1994 officially ordered the creation of the National Library of Kuwait, and entrusted it with the responsibility of collecting, organizing, preserving, and documenting the national heritage and the state of Kuwait's intellectual and cultural output.

== See also ==
- List of national libraries
