= Seychelles National Library =

Library in Victoria, Mahé, Seychelles

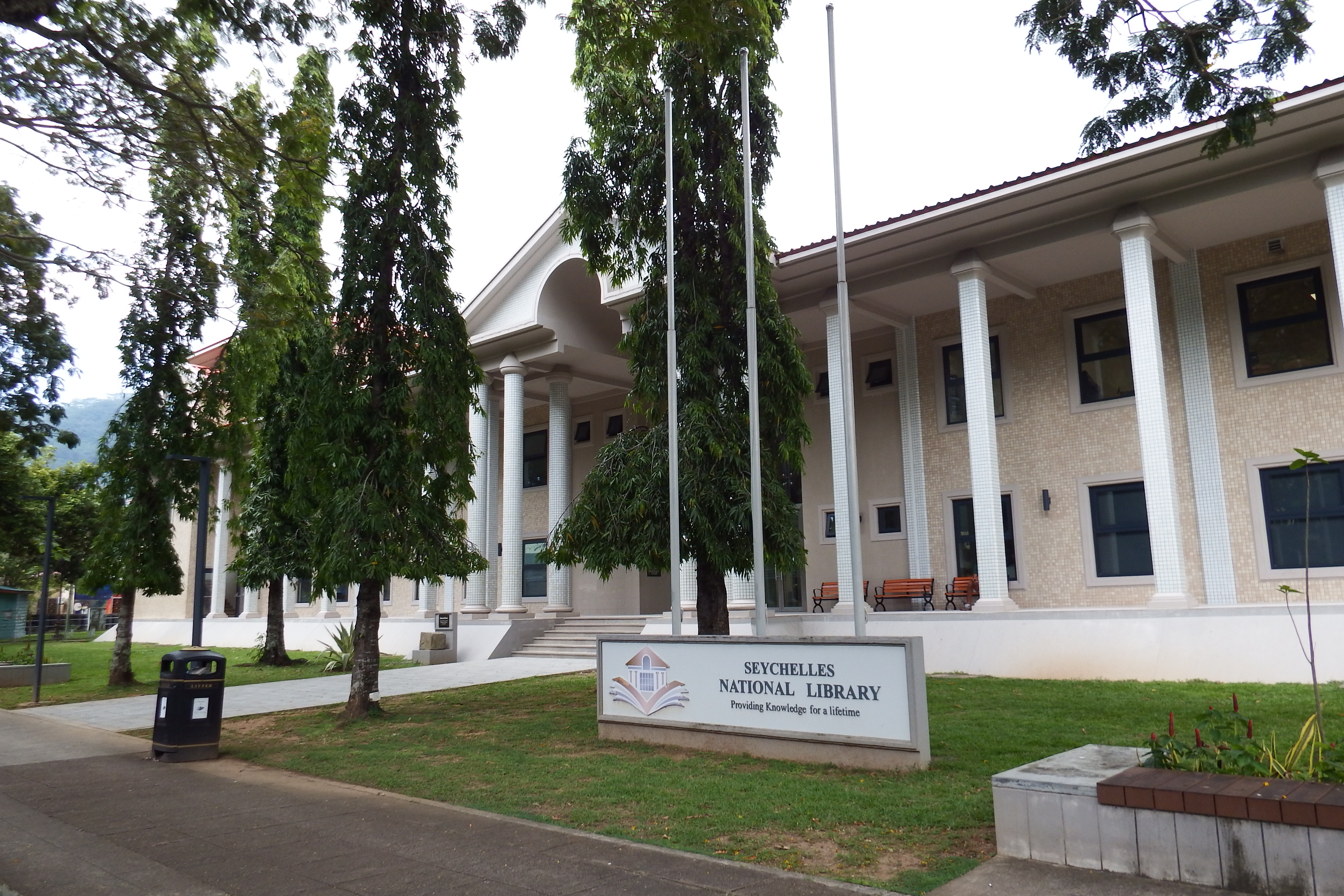
- Façade of the Seychelles National Library
- 4.625981917275498°S 55.4540799596974°E
- Location: Francis Rachel Street, Mahé, Seychelles, Seychelles
- Type: National library
- Established: 22 January 1910; 115 years ago (as Carnegie Public Library); 15 December 1978; 47 years ago (as National Library of Seychelles)

Collection
- Items collected: books, journals, newspapers, magazines, sound and music recordings, patents, databases, maps, stamps, prints, drawings and manuscripts

Other information
- Parent organization: Government of Seychelles
- Website: natlibsey.com

The Seychelles National Library (also known as National Library of the Seychelles) is a library located in Victoria, Mahé, Seychelles. It is the legal deposit and copyright library for Seychelles.

== History ==
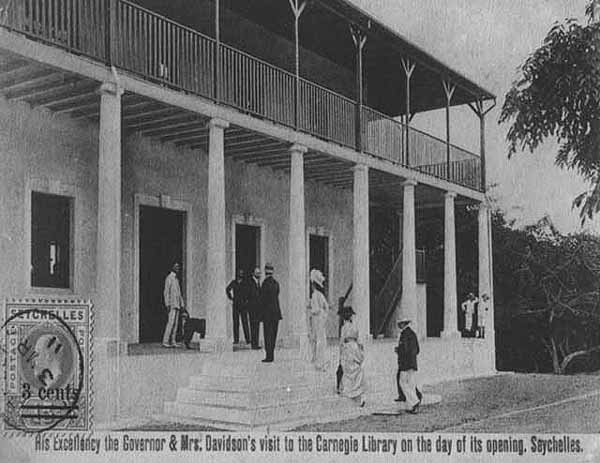
A postcard image of the visit of Sir Walter Edward Davidson and his wife on the day the library opened, 22 January 1910.

The Seychelles National Library's predecessor, the Carnegie Public Library, opened in 1910. It was funded by the Carnegie Trust Fund and managed by a board of trustees. A grant of £1,750 was provided by the Trust Fund for setting it up. In 1970, the Department of Education took over and renamed it the Carnegie Public Library, leading to the dissolution of the board.

In 1978, the Carnegie Public Library became the National Library of Seychelles. The following year, it moved to a newly renovated building on State House Avenue. It was the actual mayor’s office building where it stayed until 1994, when the entire book collection was transferred to the new campus on Francis Rachel Street (Rue de la Possession).

The British Council supported the library by providing a grant for new shelves, appointing an English librarian, and expanding the collection.

=== Restoration ===
In August 2013, the National Library building, which accommodated both the National Archives and the library, was closed due to a fungal infestation. To address this issue, the Green Island Construction Company was awarded a renovation contract worth $5.6 million (SCR75 million). Presently, the National Archives are located at Maison Helena on Ile du Port, an artificial island adjacent to the capital city of Victoria.

== See also ==
- List of national libraries
