= List of libraries in Burundi =

There are several libraries in Burundi. The National Library and archives is situated in Bujumbura. The University of Burundi library opened in 1981, and was formally dedicated in 1985. It had about 150,000 volumes in the early 1990s.

== National Library ==
National Library of Burundi is the national library of Burundi, located in Bujumbura. It was established on 20 September 1989 by the Department of Culture in the Ministry of Youth, Sports and Culture under Ministerial Order No. 670/1358. The national librarian is Marie Bernadette Ntahorwamiye.

The library contains both the library and national archives. Though in the early 1990s the collection was still not professionally organized, due to lack of staff and funding, the library has book and card catalogues and a reading room.

According to the United Nations, as of 2014 approximately 61 percent of adult Burundians are literate.

== University collections ==
The University of Burundi library opened in 1981, and was formally dedicated in 1985. It had about 150,000 volumes in the early 1990s. The higher military institute had 4600 volumes at this time. The university libraries offer library tours and instruction to students at the beginning of each academic year. The Department of Library Science at the University of Burundi offers a two-year course for aspiring librarians. There is also a collection at the Institute of Agriculture in Gitega.

== Government collections ==
Government collections include the National Center for Statistical Documentation in the Ministry of Planning, the Ministry of Agriculture's Library of Agronomic Services, the Ministry of Education's Department of Scientific Research library, and the Ministry of Public Administration's Continuing Education Center.

== See also ==
- List of national libraries

== Bibliography ==
- J.B. Cuypers (1969), Burundi: Musée national; annexes: Bibliothèque nationale, Archives nationales (in French), Unesco, OCLC 36184294
- Marcel Lajeunesse, ed. (2008). "Burundi". Les Bibliothèques nationales de la francophonie (PDF) (in French) (3rd ed.). Bibliothèque et Archives nationales du Québec. p. 22. OCLC 401164333. "Bibliothèque nationale du Burundi"
