= Pedro Henríquez Ureña National Library =

National library of the Dominican Republic

- Biblioteca Nacional Pedro Henríquez Ureña
- 18.47096721015304°N 69.90720748916202°W
- Location: Santo Domingo, Dominican Republic
- Type: National library
- Established: 1971

Collection
- Legal deposit: Yes

Other information
- Website: bnphu.gob.do (in Spanish)

Biblioteca Nacional Pedro Henríquez Ureña (in English: Pedro Henríquez Ureña National Library) is the national library of the Dominican Republic. It is the legal deposit and copyright library for the Dominican Republic. It was inaugurated on February 28, 1971.

== See also ==
- List of national libraries
