= Comoros National Library =

National library of Comoros

Comoros National Library المكتبة الوطنية لجزر القمر
- Location: Moroni, Comoros, Comoros
- Type: National library
- Established: 1979

Collection
- Size: Around 2,400,000

Comoros National Library is located in Moroni, Comoros, and is owned by the National Center for Documentation and Scientific Research, which is affiliated with other institutions, the most important of which are the National Archives and the National Museum.
