= National Library of Guatemala =

National Library of Guatemala "Luis Cardoza y Aragón"
- Biblioteca Nacional De Guatemala "Luis Cardoza Y Aragón"
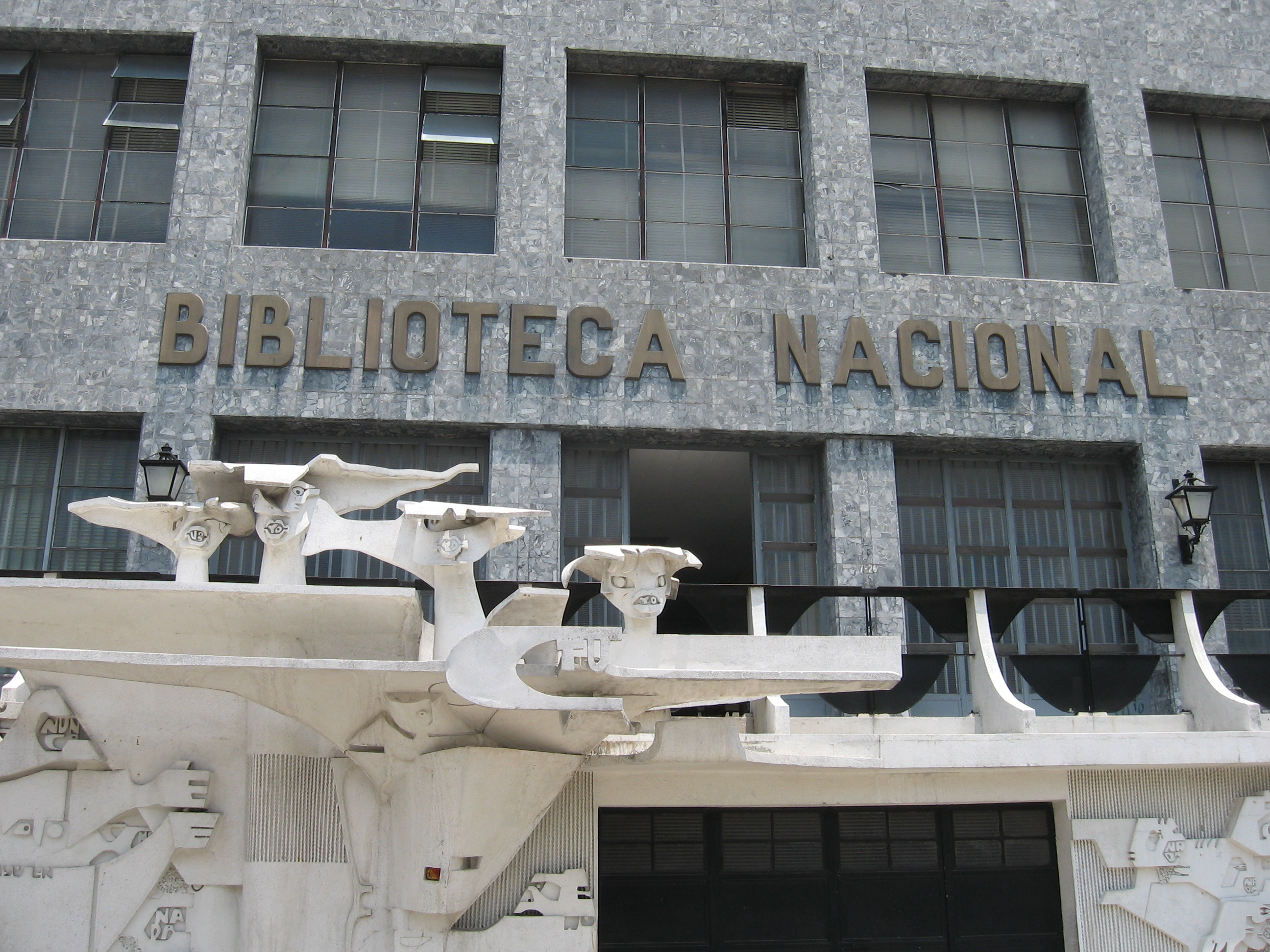
- National Library of Guatemala Luis Cardoza y Aragón
- 14.641958456765092°N 90.51439152980537°W
- Location: Guatemala City, Guatemala
- Type: national library
- Established: 1879

Other information
- Website: mcd.gob.gt

The National Library of Guatemala (Biblioteca Nacional) is the national library of Guatemala. It is located in Zone 1 of Guatemala City near the National Palace of Guatemala.

The library has 7 reading rooms among them are:

School reading room with 225,000 books.

General reading room with 110,000 books together with collections of old books separate from the old books reading room.

Old books reading room with 30,000 books.

Blind people reading room with 700 books and 1000 copies of audio material, also there is virtual library for blind people with 35,000 titles.
