= National Library of Ivory Coast =

- Bibliothèque Nationale de Côte d'Ivoire
- View of the National Library of Ivory Coast
- 5.335383010822091°N 4.02397199706998°W
- Location: Abidjan, Côte d'Ivoire
- Type: National library
- Dissolved: 2006

National Library of Ivory Coast (French: Bibliothèque Nationale de Côte d'Ivoire) is located in Abidjan, Ivory Coast.

It was closed in 2006 because of lack of funding and a new team led by Adjiman Nandoh Chantal has been at work since February 2008 and aims to restore and renew the institution. As of October 2009, 85% of the building is still closed. The only available section is the Children's Department, which opened back in 2008 thanks to the Mitsubishi corporation (cost: 31,492,000 CFA Francs)

== Bibliography ==
- Marcel Lajeunesse, ed. (2008). "Côte d'Ivoire". Les Bibliothèques nationales de la francophonie (PDF) (in French) (3rd ed.). Bibliothèque et Archives nationales du Québec. OCLC 401164333.
- "Cote d'Ivoire", World Report 2010, The Hague: International Federation of Library Associations, OCLC 225182140, archived from the original on 2019-06-29, "Freedom of access to information" (Includes information about the national library)
