= Cyprus Library =

National library of Cyprus

- Κυπριακή Βιβλιοθήκη (Greek); Kıbrıs Kütüphanesi (Turkish)
- 35°10′8.84″N 33°21′43.88″E
- Location: Nicosia, Cyprus
- Type: National library
- Established: 1927 (99 years ago)
- Branches: 1

Collection
- Items collected: Books, Journals, Newspapers, Magazines, Maps, videos and Posters
- Legal deposit: None

Other information
- Employees: 12
- Website: www.cypruslibrary.gov.cy

The Cyprus Library (Greek: Κυπριακή Βιβλιοθήκη, Kypriakī́ Vivliothī́kī, Turkish: Kıbrıs Kütüphanesi) is the national library of the Republic of Cyprus.

Its aim is to secure, process, and make available publications that are produced in Cyprus or have to do with Cyprus.

== History ==
The Cyprus Library was founded by the British Colonial Governor Sir Ronald Storrs, who noticed the lack of a public library in Cyprus. During the period books were brought from Britain to add to the library. It used to work under the Ministry of Education, Culture and Youth, but after the establishment of a separate Deputy Ministry of Culture, it is now organised under it.

In 1968 the Cyprus Public Library Law moved control of the library from the Municipality of Nicosia to the Ministry of Education and Culture and it merged its collections with the Ministry's Library. In 1974 it was relocated to its original premises on the D'Avila Bastion of the Venetian walls of Nicosia. In 1987 a new law establishing the Cyprus Library was passed. In 2022 it came under the control of the newly established Deputy Ministry of Culture.

== Holdings ==
The Cyprus Library houses over 178,000 books.

The oldest work in the possession of the Library is Malta Illustrata, the first book that was published in Malta in 1647, written by Giovanfrancesco Abela.

== Locations ==
Main Location:

Eleftherias Square, 1011 Lefkosia

Reference Department

46th Faneromenis Str. 1011 Lefkosia (Former Faneromeni Library)

Two additional locations used for digitisation, storage and conservation of books.

== Publications about the Cyprus Library ==
- Ανδρέου, Α. Κ. & Τσιμπόγλου, Φ. Χ. (2010). Στρατηγικό Σχέδιο Ανάπτυξης της Κυπριακής Βιβλιοθήκης 2010-2014. Από την πραγματικότητα στο ιδεώδες, μέσω του εφικτού. Λευκωσία.

== See also ==
- List of national libraries
