= National Library of Panama =

Library in Panama

Coordinates: 9.0002°N 79.5078°W

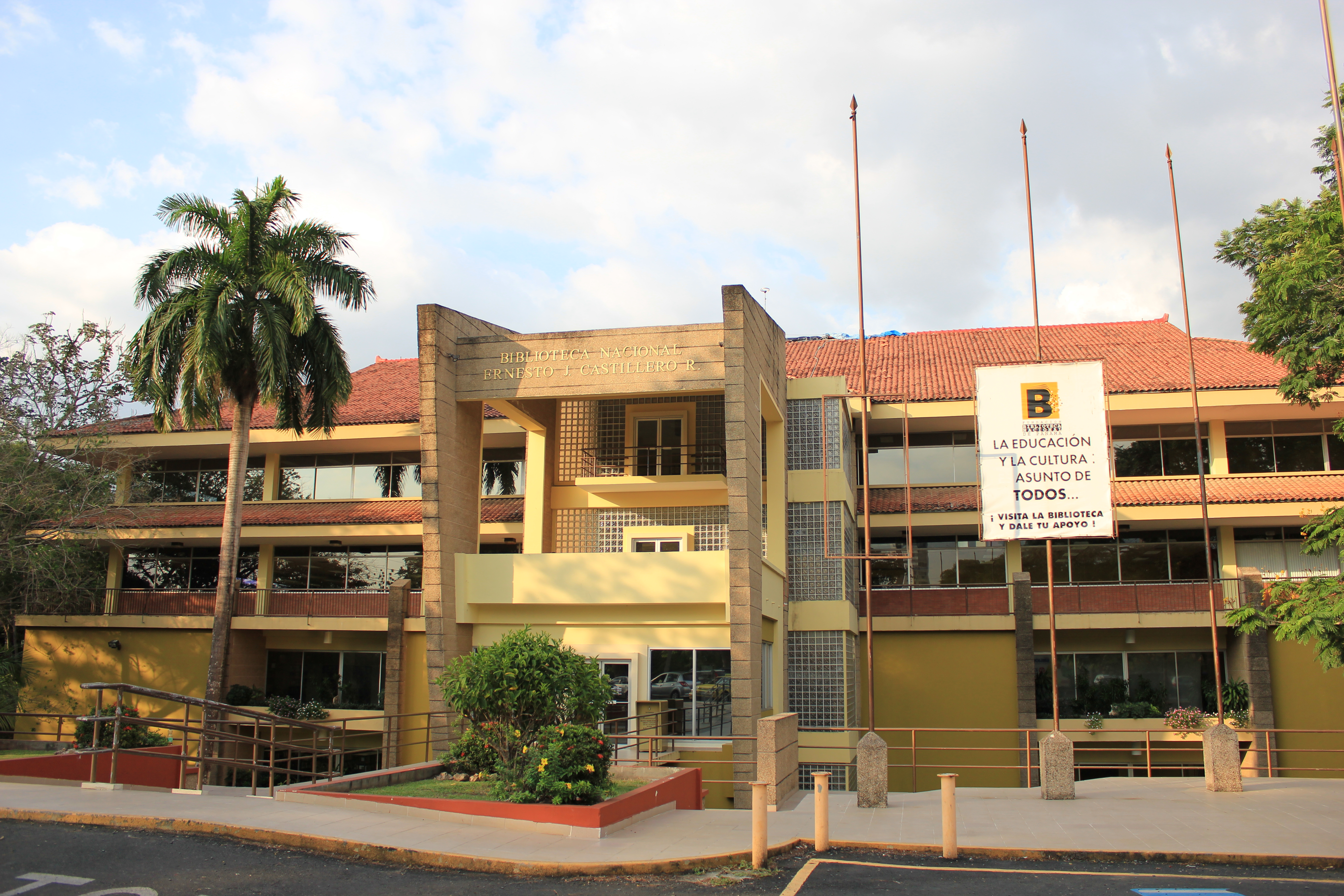

The Biblioteca Nacional de Panamá (in English: National Library of Panama), in Panama City, is the legal deposit and copyright library for Panama.

The library opened its doors on July 11, 1942, in a room located between 5th and 6th streets, adjacent to the presidency. In January 1961, the venue was moved to a building which had previously served as the Ricardo H. Newman College. On September 24, 1987, the library moved to Memorial Park Omar Torrijos, on Avenida Belisario Porras.

== Library directors ==
- Ernesto J. Castillero R. 1942–1945
- Galileo Patiño 1945–1953
- Pereira Bonifacio 1953–1957
- Ana Maria Jaen 1957–1966
- Galileo Patiño 1966–1968
- Angela Alvarado 1968–1969
- Carmen Cecilia Lasso 1969–1971
- Raquel P. Zuniga 1971–1975
- Algis E. Borrero 1976–1978
- Ferguson Anays 1978–1980
- Algis E. Borrero 1980–1986
- Ferguson Anays 1986–1987
- Algis E. Borrero 1987–1988
- Algeria S. Pimentel 1988–1992
- Gloria Rodriguez de Robles 1993–1994
- Orestes Manuel Nieto 1994–1995
- Algeria S. Pimentel 1995–1998

== Directors National Library Foundation of Panama (1996–present) ==
- Barrantes Nitzia Technical Director
- Maria Brenes Majela Administrative Director
