= European Library =

Web service providing access to resources of national libraries across Europe

The European Library

- Website type: Portal to the content of Europe's national and research libraries
- Headquarters: Dutch Royal Library, Netherlands
- Owner: CENL (a consortium of 49 national libraries)
- Website: europeana.eu/tel
- Commercial: No
- Launched: 17 March 2005

The European Library was an Internet service that allows access to the resources of 49 European national libraries and an increasing number of research libraries. Searching is free and delivers metadata records as well as digital objects, mostly free of charge. The objects come from institutions located in countries which are members of the Council of Europe and range from catalogue records to full-text books, magazines, journals and audio recordings. Over 200 million records are searchable, including 24 million pages of full-text content and more than 7 million digital objects. Thirty five different languages are represented among the searchable objects.

The content of the European Library was frozen on 31 December 2016, with no new updates after that date.

== History and concept ==
The European Library of today has evolved from a number of earlier projects.

Its starting point was in 1997 when the GABRIEL (Gateway and Bridge to Europe's National Libraries) project set out to establish a joint web portal of European national libraries. At a basic level, the portal provided information about each library's collections and access to their online public access catalogues (OPACs).

The European Library exists to open up the universe of knowledge, information and cultures of all Europe's national libraries.

— European Library Mission

GABRIEL was followed by the TEL (The European Library) project, which ran from 2001 to 2004 and created a framework for access to key national and deposit collections within Europe. The project was part-funded under the Fifth Framework Programme of the European Commission. The national libraries involved in the TEL project were those of Finland, Germany, Italy (Florence), Italy (Rome), Netherlands, Portugal, Slovenia, Switzerland and United Kingdom.

This led to the launch of TheEuropeanLibrary.org portal on 17 March 2005.

Between 2005 and 2007, the TEL-ME-MOR project helped to incorporate 10 more national libraries from new European Union member states as full partners of The European Library. By the beginning of 2008, a further nine national libraries within the European Union and the European Free Trade Association had joined the service.

The European Library took a further step towards its enlargement with the EDLproject, during which national libraries continued to join The European Library. The project also focused on multilingualism, undertook the first steps towards a European Metadata Registry and created a roadmap for potential digitization efforts in the national libraries.

Year of Joining	National Libraries
2005	Netherlands, Switzerland, UK, Finland, France, Germany, Portugal, Italy-Florence, Italy-Rome
2006	Malta, Cyprus, Czech Republic, Hungary, Latvia, Lithuania, Slovenia, Estonia, Poland, Slovakia, Austria, Serbia, Croatia, Denmark
2007	Belgium, Greece, Iceland, Ireland, Liechtenstein, Luxembourg, Norway, Spain, Sweden, Russia-Moscow
2008	Albania, Azerbaijan, Armenia, Bosnia & Herzegovina, Bulgaria, North Macedonia, Georgia, Moldova, Montenegro, Romania, Turkey, Russia Saint Petersburg, Ukraine
*	San Marino, Vatican City (collections not searchable)
2011	Wales

== The European Library and Europeana ==
The European Library (TEL) provided much of the organization and support required to launch Europeana – a European Commission initiative that makes millions of digital objects from libraries, museums and archives accessible to the public via the Europeana website.

When the European Parliament called for Europeana to be established, the Conference of European National Librarians (CENL), under the auspices of the National Library of the Netherlands and CENL's service The European Library, were asked to submit for a project under the eContentplus programme.

== Virtual exhibitions ==
In addition to its search engine, The European Library pulls together themes from the collections of Europe's national libraries and displays them in virtual exhibitions. These exhibitions unite geographically disparate objects in a single online space, offering Pan-European sources on the topic.

- Manuscripts and Princes in Medieval and Renaissance Europe: 34 manuscripts from the royal collections of the Carolingian Emperors, French King Charles V and his family, and the Aragonese kings of Naples.
- Travelling Through History: Centuries worth of travel memorabilia from 13 European libraries, including photographs, sounds, maps and books.
- Reading Europe: Almost 1,000 books selected by national libraries, with curatorial information and full-text versions in most cases.
- A Roma Journey: Texts, photographs, paintings and recordings of traditional songs showing the heritage of the Romani people in Europe.
- Napoleonic Wars: A selection of portraits, military maps, city plans, letters, books and other material from the Napoleonic Wars.
- Treasures of Europe's National Libraries: A collection of objects selected by Europe's national libraries as some of the most outstanding items in their collections.
- National Library Buildings: Images of the National Libraries that are partners of The European Library.

== Financing and ownership ==
The European Library is financed by its owners, the Conference of European National Librarians (CENL). The portal is maintained by The European Library Office located in the premises of the Dutch Royal Library in The Hague. Its programme director is Jill Cousins.

== Partner libraries ==
The 49 National Libraries who participate in The European Library project are:

- Albania: Biblioteka Kombëtare e Shqipërisë
- Armenia: Հայաստանի Ազգային գրադարան
- Austria: Österreichische Nationalbibliothek
- Azerbaijan: Mirzə Fətəli Axundov adına Azərbaycan Milli Kitabxanası
- Belgium: Koninklijke Bibliotheek België
- Bosnia and Herzegovina: Nacionalna i univerzitetska biblioteka Bosne i Hercegovine
- Bulgaria: Национална библиотека „Свети Свети Кирил и Методий
- Croatia: Nacionalna i sveučilišna knjižnica u Zagrebu
- Cyprus: Κυπριακή Βιβλιοθήκη
- Czech Republic: Národní knihovna České republiky
- Denmark: Det Kongelige Bibliotek
- Estonia: Eesti Rahvusraamatukogu
- Finland: Kansalliskirjasto
- France: Bibliothèque nationale de France
- Georgia: საქართველოს პარლამენტის ეროვნული ბიბლიოთეკა
- Germany: German National Library
- Greece: Εθνική Βιβλιοθήκη
- Hungary: Országos Széchényi Könyvtár
- Iceland: Landsbókasafn Íslands – Háskólabókasafn
- Ireland: Leabharlann Náisiúnta na hÉireann
- Italy-Florence: Biblioteca Nazionale Centrale di Firenze
- Italy-Rome: Biblioteca Nazionale Centrale
- Latvia: Latvijas Nacionālā bibliotēka
- Liechtenstein: Liechtensteinische Landesbibliothek

- Lithuania: Lietuvos nacionalinė Martyno Mažvydo biblioteka
- Luxembourg: Bibliothèque nationale de Luxembourg
- Malta: Bibljoteka Nazzjonali ta' Malta
- Moldova: Biblioteca Naţională a Republicii Moldova
- Montenegro: Centralna narodna biblioteka Crne Gore
- Netherlands: Koninklijke Bibliotheek
- North Macedonia: Национална и универзитетска библиотека „Св. Климент Охридски"
- Norway: Nasjonalbiblioteket
- Poland: Biblioteka Narodowa
- Portugal: Biblioteca Nacional de Portugal
- Romania: Biblioteca Naţională a României
- Russia-Moscow: Российская государственная библиотека
- Russia-St.Petersburg: Rossiiskaya Natsionalnaya Biblioteka
- San Marino: Biblioteca di Stato e Beni Librari
- Serbia: Народна библиотека Србије / Narodna biblioteka Srbije
- Slovakia: Slovenská národná knižnica
- Slovenia: Narodna in univerzitetna knjižnica
- Spain: Biblioteca Nacional de España
- Sweden: Kungliga biblioteket
- Switzerland: Swiss National Library
- Turkey: Millî Kütüphane
- Ukraine: Національна бібліотека України імені В.І. Вернадського
- United Kingdom: British Library
- Vatican City: Bibliotheca Apostolica Vaticana
- Wales: National Library of Wales

Research Libraries who have also contributed content to The European Library as a result of the Europeana Libraries project include:

- Bavarian State Library
- Belgrade University Library
- Hungarian Parliament Library
- National Library of Wales
- Romanian Academy Library
- Trinity College Dublin
- Universidad Complutense de Madrid
- University of Berne
- University College London
- University of Ghent

- University of Leuven
- University of Lund
- University of Oxford
- University of Sibiu
- University of Tartu Library
- University of Uppsala
- University of Vienna
- Wellcome Trust Library
- Zentralbibliothek Zürich

== See also ==
- Europeana
- Virtual Centre for Knowledge on Europe
