= National Library of Somalia =

- Matxafka Qaranka
- 2.037654388254787°N 45.33878601434784°E
- Location: Mogadishu, Somalia
- Type: National library
- Established: 1975

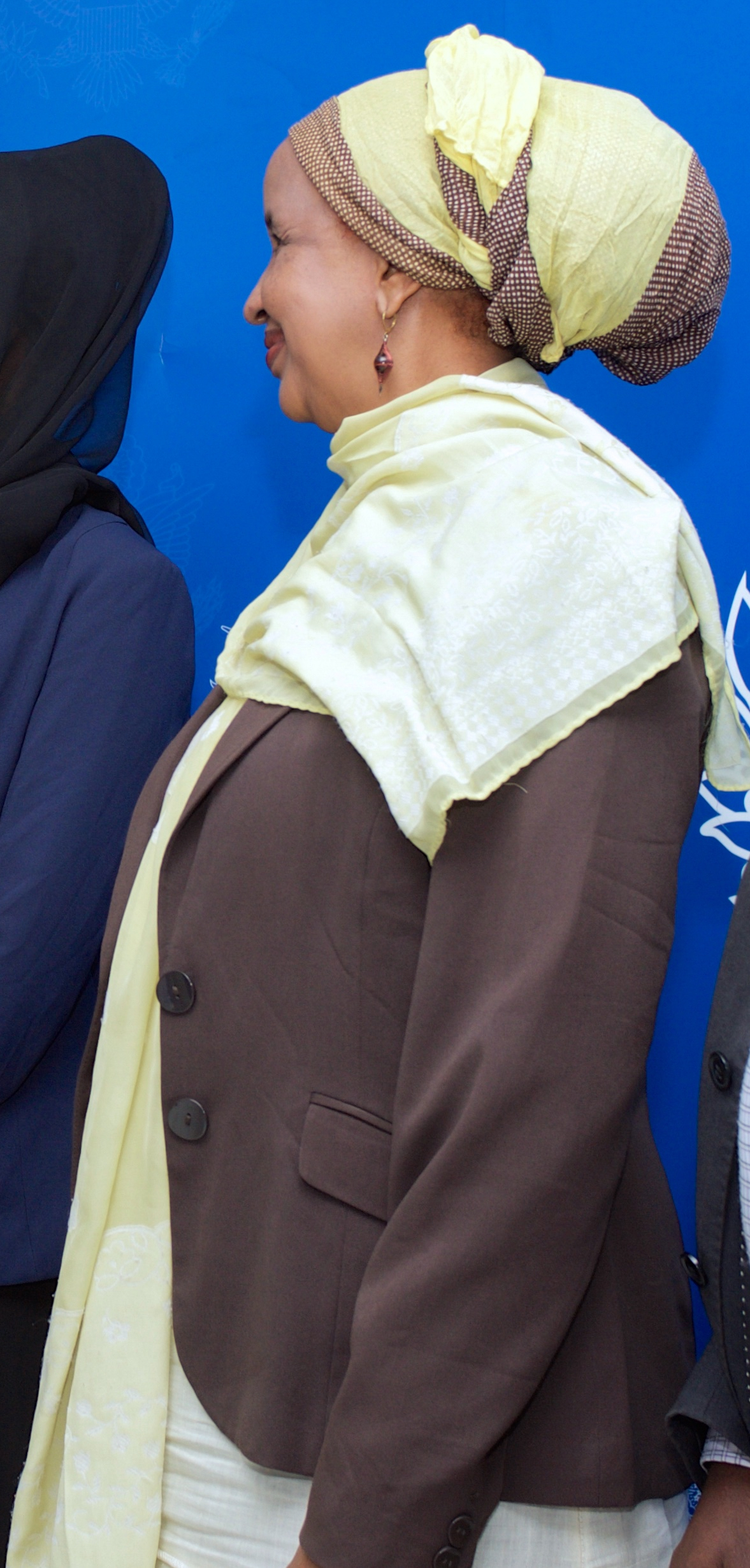
Zainab Hassan, Director of the National Library of Somalia

The National Library of Somalia is a national library in Mogadishu, the capital of Somalia.

== History ==
The National Library was established in 1975, and was open to the general public. In 1983, it held approximately 7,000 books, with limited historical and cultural archival material.

The National Library later closed down in the 1990s during the Somali Civil War. In June 2013, the Heritage Institute for Policy Studies organized a shipment of 22,000 books from the United States to Somalia as part of an initiative to restock the library. In December of that year, the Somali authorities officially launched a major project to rebuild the National Library.

With Zainab Hassan serving as Director, the $1 million federal government-funded initiative intends for a new library complex to be built in the capital within six months. In preparation for the relaunch, 60,000 additional books from other Arab League states are expected to arrive.
