= National Library of the Chechen Republic =

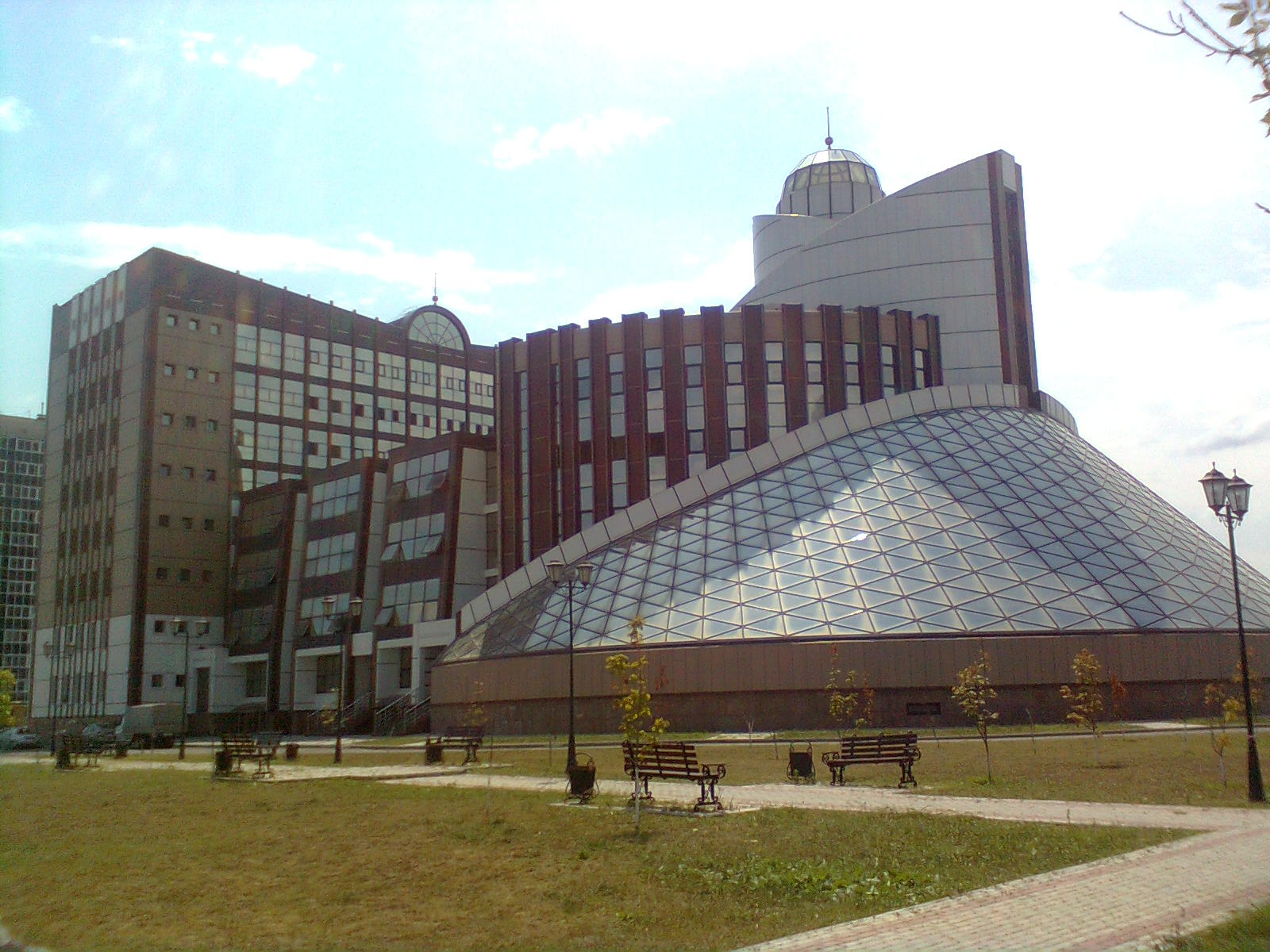

The National Library of the Chechen Republic, formerly known as Chekhovka (for Anton Chekhov), is in the Chechnya's capital city Grozny. The library has appeared on stamps.

The library was established in 1904. It had 2.5 million books before the wars in Chechnya. The former library building was destroyed in the First Chechen War.

== See also ==
- List of national and state libraries
