= National Library of Bahrain at Isa Cultural Centre =

National library of Bahrain

National Library of Kingdom of Bahrain at Isa Cultural Centre المكتبة الوطنية بمركز عيسى الثقافي بمملكة البحرين

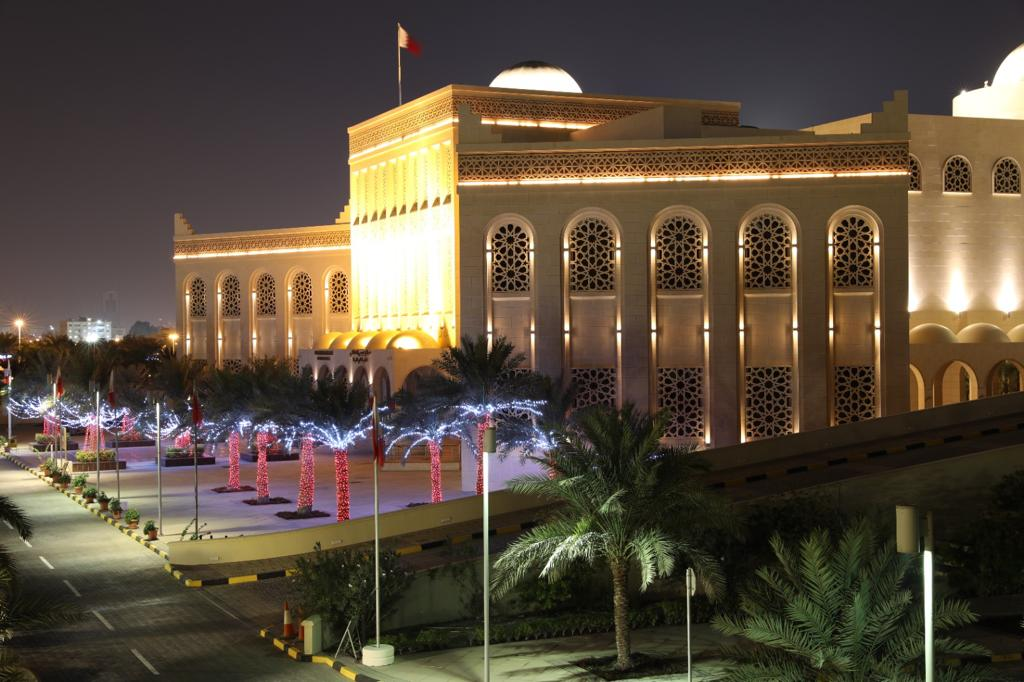
- 26°13′14″N 50°35′58″E
- Location: Manama, Bahrain, Bahrain
- Type: National library
- Established: 18 December 2008; 17 years ago

Collection
- Size: >100.000

Other information
- Website: icc.gov.bh

The National Library at Isa Cultural Centre is the national library for Bahrain. The library is housed within the Isa Cultural Centre, a national cultural centre affiliated with the Royal Court of Bahrain. The center was opened on 18 December 2008.

== Functions ==
The library is working to accomplish the following functions:

- Encouraging reading, research, reading and providing advanced library services to all beneficiaries.
- Collecting and preserving the national intellectual production in its various forms and informing about it through the issuance of national bibliographies and working to deposit it in the library.
- Collecting and preserving manuscripts, documents, rare books and government publications in all its forms.
- Providing various sources of knowledge in all its forms
- Develop the exchange of publications with national libraries and other information centers.
