= National Library of Jordan =

- دائرة المكتبة الوطنية
- 31.978751283166407°N 35.9063701182709°E
- Location: Haroun Al Rasheed St 9, Amman, Jordan
- Type: Public, National library
- Established: 1977 (49 years ago)

Collection
- Legal deposit: yes

Other information
- Director: Dr. Nedhal Al Ahmad
- Website: www.nl.gov.jo

The National Library of Jordan is the legal deposit and copyright library of Jordan. It was founded in 1977.

== History ==
- 1977: Establishing the Directorate of Libraries and National Documents.
- 1990: The Directorate of Libraries and National Documents was replaced by two new entities:

- Department of the National Library.
- Documentation Center

- 1994: Both the department of the National Library and Documentation Center were merged to be a separate department connected to the Minister of Culture under the name the Department of the National Library.

== Department of the National Library tasks ==
- National intellectual product promotion and preservation.
- Collecting intellectual product mainly related to the National Jordanian Heritage. Other intellectual product area of interest: Arab World, Arabic & Islamic civilization, and Human Heritage in general.
- Preserving documents from different public institutions, documents relevant to Jordan in addition to private documents.
- Providing depository services.
- Issuing the Jordanian National Bibliography.
- Publishing and facilitating material related to libraries' work.
- Coordinating the work of public libraries.
- Allowing access to researchers.
- Mutual lending with other national, regional & international libraries.
- Organizing different cultural events.
- Exchanging & gifting materials.
- Cooperation with international entities in relation to library services.
