= Libraries in Lesotho =

As of 2013, Lesotho contains three main libraries: The National Library, the Thomas Mofolo Library and National Archives at the University of Lesotho, and the Morija Museum & Archives, though there are a range of "academic and research libraries, documentation centres, school libraries, special libraries, public libraries and a national library services system".

The National Library of Lesotho is situated in the national capital of Maseru, and had a collection of around 88,000 volumes in 2007. The Thomas Mofolo Library, situated in the University of Lesotho, in the village of Roma, about 34 km from Maseru, is larger, with a collection of around 170,000 volumes as of 2007. The National Archives are housed in the basement of the library at the University of Lesotho. They contain a wide range of material, including newspapers dated back to the early 20th century and almost a full collection of Basutoland Annual Colonial reports. Both the National Library and archive collections were boosted in 2005 when the Chinese invested in them. Though many official court documents have been lost, significant material from the colonial period remains. A Legal Deposit was proposed by the Lesotho Library Association in around 1987, but as of 1999 had not been created.

The Morija collection contains an array of colonial documents and newspapers from Basutoland, including early editions of the Naledi newspaper, and documents of the Proceedings of the Basutoland National Council and annual colonial reports. and Paris Evangelical Mission Society.

== See also ==
- List of national libraries
