= National Library of Angola =

Library in Luanda, Angola

- Biblioteca Nacional de Angola
- 8°49′41.9″S 13°14′22.3″E
- Location: Luanda, Angola
- Type: National library
- Established: 1969
- Reference to legal mandate: N.º 49 448, de 27 de Dezembro de 1969, Boletim Oficial n.º 301

Collection
- Size: 20,000-30,000

Other information
- Budget: $413,214.38
- Director: Maria José Ramos
- Employees: 32

The National Library of Angola (Portuguese: Biblioteca Nacional de Angola) is located in Luanda. (Note: According to the United Nations, as of 2014 approximately 66 percent of adult Angolans are literate.)

== See also ==
- List of libraries in Angola
- Arquivo Histórico Nacional (Angola)
- List of national libraries

== Bibliography ==
- "Angola", World Report 2010, The Hague: International Federation of Library Associations, OCLC 225182140, archived from the original on 2019-06-29, "Freedom of access to information" (Includes information about the national library)
