= National Library of Northern Cyprus =

National Library of Northern Cyprus Millî Kütüphane
- Location: Northern Nicosia, De jure Cyprus; De facto Northern Cyprus
- Type: National Library
- Established: November 17, 1958

Collection
- Size: 229.626 books

Other information
- Director: Umure Örs
- Website: http://mkutup.mebnet.net/ (In Turkish)

The National Library of Northern Cyprus (Turkish: Millî Kütüphane) is the National Library of the Turkish Republic of Northern Cyprus, located in Nicosia. It was founded on November 17, 1958. As of October 2009, the collection consists of 229,626 books.
