= List of libraries in the Federated States of Micronesia =

The following is a list of libraries in the Federated States of Micronesia.

- College of Micronesia-FSM library
- Congress of Micronesia Library
- FSM Supreme Court Law Library
- Pohnpei Public Library
- Pohnpei State Medical Library
- Rose Mackwelung Library

== See also ==
- List of library associations - Micronesia
