= Egyptian National Agricultural Library =

Library in Egypt

The Egyptian National Agricultural Library (ENAL) officially opened in September 1996. It is located on the first two floors of the Land Improvement Building in St. Dokki, Giza, spans 6,200 square meters and can seat close to 300 people.

In 1995, ENAL and the United States National Agricultural Library (NAL) produced a CD-ROM of Nicoll's Birds of Egypt of 1930. This 2 volume 700 page work was published through NAL's National Agricultural Text Digitizing Program.
