= National Library of Solomon Islands =

Public library in the Solomon Islands

National Library of the Solomon Islands
- 9°26′11.9″S 159°57′52.1″E
- Location: Honiara, Solomon Islands
- Type: National library

The National Library of Solomon Islands, sometimes Solomon Islands Public Library, was founded on June 26, 1974 and is located in Honiara, capital of the Solomon Islands. Its opening took place on July 17, 1980.

In 2015, the library collection contained 15'000 documents, of which 5'000 were general works for reference and 10'000 works were preserved within the national collection.

Upon foundation, the principal aim of the National Library was the reorganisation of existing library services and their expansion to the whole of the nation.

== Main objectives ==
In 2014, the National Library defined its main aim to be the promotion of the following objectives:

- Offering to every citizen and the public at large the opportunity to access reading material as a way to foster self development and recreation;
- Promote literacy, encourage reading and disseminating of information and ideas through the establishment of public libraries, a mobile library service, as well as provincial and community library services;
- Offer library services to the Parliament, the Governmental Departments, the authorities, and to institutions (including the schools and the libraries who voices such a claim);
- Arrange under the sign of national library services the professional procedures regarding libraries which are members of this service within the Solomon Islands;
- Counsel, coordinate and streamline the resources and services of government department libraries;
- Maintain, develop, and preserve a national collection of library resources, including a comprehensive collection of library resources relating to the Solomon Islands and its people.;
- Determine training standards for library staff.

== History and noteworthy facts ==
In an encyclopedia published in 1980, it was reported that the National Library was responsible for coordinating all activities of the 21 libraries operating in the Solomon Islands. Particular attention was paid to services in the provinces due to the high percentage (approximately 90%) of the population living outside the capital. Numerous initiatives were put in place to address this and other issues. These included book boxes, mobile units, the creation of a network catalog, and an interlibrary loan service.

In the early 1970s, a national collection of the Solomon Islands and the Pacific region was established at the Library's headquarters thanks to donations from overseas and sporadic purchases. At the same time, legal deposit was introduced in 1972.

When it opened in 1974, its main objective was to reorganize existing library services and extend reading services to the entire nation.

In 1976, the promotion of services became possible. From then on, story times were organized, local schools visited the library, and stories were even broadcast on the radio. It was then possible to go to the library to read in relaxation areas, as opening hours were decided according to the pace of life of the Solomon Islanders.

The Libraries Act of 1979 officially established the National Library and assigned it the task of providing an effective service throughout the Solomon Islands.

Between 1980 and 1981, the library is moving from Honiara Secondary School to a building behind the Honiara Public Library and opposite the Ministry of Infrastructure and Development. It was still located there in 2016.

A few years later, in an article dating from 1992, it was reported once again that the National Library was seeking to extend its services to various provincial centers across the country, despite particularly limited resources. When conditions were right, additional efforts were made to extend services directly to rural communities and schools.

Since 2007, a story time has been specially set up for children who do not have access to childcare services. Its target audience is children aged 3 to 5, and it takes place twice a week on Tuesdays and Wednesdays from 10 to 11 a.m.

For the year 2015, it was revealed that the National Library's budget was $560,336, which was allocated by the Ministry of Education. At that time, the library had a total of eight employees, two of whom had degrees in the field, three had certificates, and three others held auxiliary positions. The number of monthly visitors was approximately 400 people. The Koha system was implemented in June and made available only to members of government ministries.

In August 2015, a network of librarians was established. It includes librarians from: government libraries; specialized libraries; the University of the South Pacific Solomon Islands' campus library; and the Solomon Islands National University library.

In November 2015, the National Library of New-Zealand invites Margaret Talasasa, then director of the Solomon Islands National Library, to join for the first time the Conference of Directors of National Libraries in Asia and Oceania that was held in Wellington.

=== Staff and training ===
The training of the entirety of the trained professionals in the Solomon Islands depended on the national library. This was caused by the fact that the closest institution offering appropriate training was in Papua New Guinea, whose public university offered training and a certificate. However, since the territory entirely insular and that the work associated tasks necessitates a certain level of education, the number of personnel to be trained is high in order maintiain that each library functions properly.

It was only when 1990 came around that rural libraries' employees were hired as national library employees, which allowed them to be part of its hierarchy and work their way up the career ladder.

=== Relevant Materials ===
A significant dearth of locally written documents or in local languages was happening in the whole of the South pacific region. Some associations were founded to deal with this crisis, but none seemed to bring any concluding solutions.

=== Decentralisation ===
When it was starting its operations, it wasn't clear which roles were to be played respectively by the national library and the provincial authorities in regards to financing and maintaining the public libraries. The absence of evidence on this matter lead to tensions between the two organisations.

=== Financing ===
As ressources were scarce on a national scale, the whole of the financing directed towards infrastructure and the foundation of collections to be owned by each library had to come from humanitarian aid initiatives. Even though the national library had the necessary funds for its personnel and all of the transportation required by its activities, this equilibrium is solely dependant on the support it receives from the government.

=== Transportation ===
The insular territory of the Solomon Islands forces the library's services to depend on the cost and schedule of the various modes of transportation, be it by plane or by boat. It results from this reality that transportation incurs high costs, bet it time or financial ressources. Furthermore, when it comes to the farthest islands, it is sometimes not a question whether or not ferries were to be used since there were only outboards and canoes that were available.
