= Antigua Public Library =

- 17.120508°N 61.838485°W
- Location: St. John's, Antigua and Barbuda
- Established: 1854

The Antigua Public Library is the national library of Antigua and Barbuda, located in St. John's, Antigua and Barbuda.

== History ==
The Antigua Public Library was founded in 1830 as a private venture. According to a 1932 report, the aim was the "gradual formation of a permanent library of general literature, and an associated reading room." Soon an act of parliament established the Antigua Library Society changing the library's status to that of a corporation. In 1843 an earthquake partially destroyed the library and its proprietors' private properties leading to their ruin. The government assumed ownership in 1854 transferring management to local trustees whose powers increased in 1871.

== Old building ==
In 1974 a major earthquake damaged the building of which was judged unsound. In 1975 the library was moved temporarily to a new location upstairs the Silston's Library, and its services scaled back to one offered mainly to children. In 1978 it moved into Lolita's Building on Market Street, its second location. There the Adult Library opened its doors. There was not enough space to accommodate a Children's Library, this was added one year later, when additional space was rented to house the Children's Department.

== New building ==
The library is situated at Hailes Promenade along the edge of downtown St. John's, next to the National Archives building and Botanical Gardens, across from the recreation grounds adjacent to the East Bus Station. The land was donated by the Government of Antigua and Barbuda. The two-story building naturally harmonized adjacent to the National Archives. Its size is approximately 12,500 square feet (in addition to a staff area of 1,100 square feet), and holds a capacity of 75,000 volumes and seating for approximately 100 people. The library's orientation is coordinated to take advantage of breeze from the northeast side. Natural ventilation and maximum utilization of daylight is facilitated by strips of continuous awing windows along the east and west facades. All exterior glass areas are shielded from direct rays of the sun. Construction of the library began in 1987 but never materialized until the Public Library Building Committee took over the project in 1989. Several hiccups were encountered major caused devastating Hurricane Luis in 1995. Strenuous efforts continued in order to complete the task of raising the needed funds.

In 2008 a $6.45 million contract was signed to complete the building. The construction was handed over to the Ministry of Public Works Department, however, the contract was withdrawn and the Antigua and Barbuda Contractors Enterprises, a local firm took over the construction. Work continued by the firm but came to a halt in 2011. In 2013 work resumed and on 2 September 2014 the building was dedicated and opened to the general public. The library provides a variety of material including: Books (fiction, non-fiction and large print); DVDs; EBooks; West Indian Collection; African Collection; Magazines and Newspapers.

Other Services provided include:

Public Computer with free wireless internet access; Conference Room; Lending; Reader's Advisory; Reference and Information services; Printing, Photocopying, Scanning, Laminating and Binding; Laptop Loan; Special Loans; Exhibition.

== See also ==
- List of national libraries
