= Andorra National Library =

National library of Andorra

- Biblioteca Nacional d'Andorra
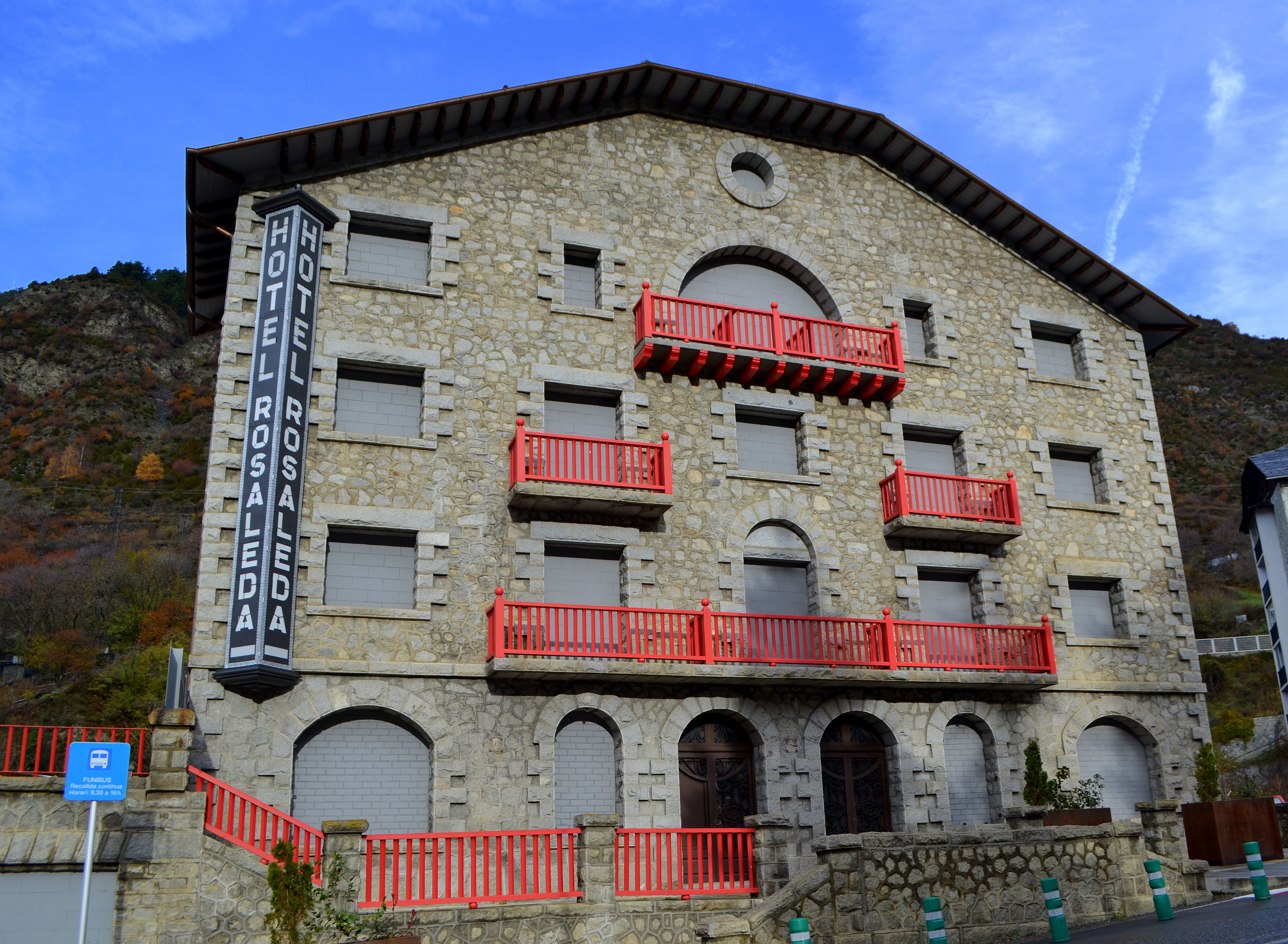
- Andorra National Library in the former Hotel Roselada in Encamp
- 42.53712°N 1.58345°E
- Location: Avinguda François Mitterrand, 13, AD200 Encamp, Andorra in the former Hotel Roselada,, Andorra
- Type: National Library
- Established: 1930 (96 years ago) / 1974

Collection
- Legal deposit: Yes

Other information
- Website: Official site

The Andorra National Library (Catalan: Biblioteca Nacional d'Andorra) was founded in 1930, then re-opened in 1974. Since 2020, it is housed in the former Hotel Rosaleda in Encamp.

Amongst other functions, it is the legal deposit and copyright library for Andorra.

== History ==
The Andorra National Library was created on September 8, 1930, with the aim of providing book lending services to the people of the valleys of Andorra (les Valls d'Andorra). It was initially housed in the hall of lost steps (sala dels passos perduts) in the Casa de la Vall (the headquarters of the General Council of Andorra). Its creation resulted from an initiative of the Andorran Society of Barcelona Residents (Sociedat Andorrana de Residents a Barcelona) together with contributions from various private individuals, and followed in the wake of the founding of other socio-cultural entities, such as the Association for the Protection of Catalan Education (Associació Protectora de l'Ensenyança Catalana).

The new library was established in 1974 with the help of Lídia Armengol i Vila. The initial collection of around 2,500 volumes came mainly from the library of the Casa de la Vall, but also included donations from the Catalan Book Exposition, donations from various publishing houses, and works acquired by the General Council of Andorra.

In 1986, after being housed in various locations, the library moved to a building called Prada Casadet. Although this building housed both the National Library and the Public Library of the Government of Andorra at the time, a small room was dedicated exclusively to the national collection.

In 1996, with the collections having grown considerably, it was decided to restructure and separate the services. The National Library of Andorra was therefore relocated to Casa Bauró, an old manor house in Andorra la Vella whilst the rest of the collection remained at Prada Casadet.

In 2020, the library was moved to the former Hotel Rosaleda in Encamp, a building of national cultural interest. This allowed the institution to further increase space available for its growing collections, as well as offer a fully accessible facility to patrons. The Ministry of Culture occupies the same building.

In addition to its other roles, the Andorra National Library has acted as the national ISBN agency for Andorra since 1987.

== National bibliography ==
The Andorran National Library has compiled its national bibliography every year under the heading "Ex Libris Casa Bauró and has digitized and made the information available going as far back as 1998 to the present on the library's website.

The Andorran National Library currently has a collection of 3957 entries among its national bibliography.

== Legal deposit ==
Legal deposit officially began in the Principality of Andorra by decree of the "General Council of Andorra" in March 1980.

The purpose of Andorra's legal deposit is to maintain a collection of printed works for statistical purposes and to preserve the heritage of the principality's literary and artistic output.

== Other libraries ==
Beyond the national library the country also has:

- 8 library branches
- 1 university library
- 25 school libraries
