= National library =

Library specifically established by the government

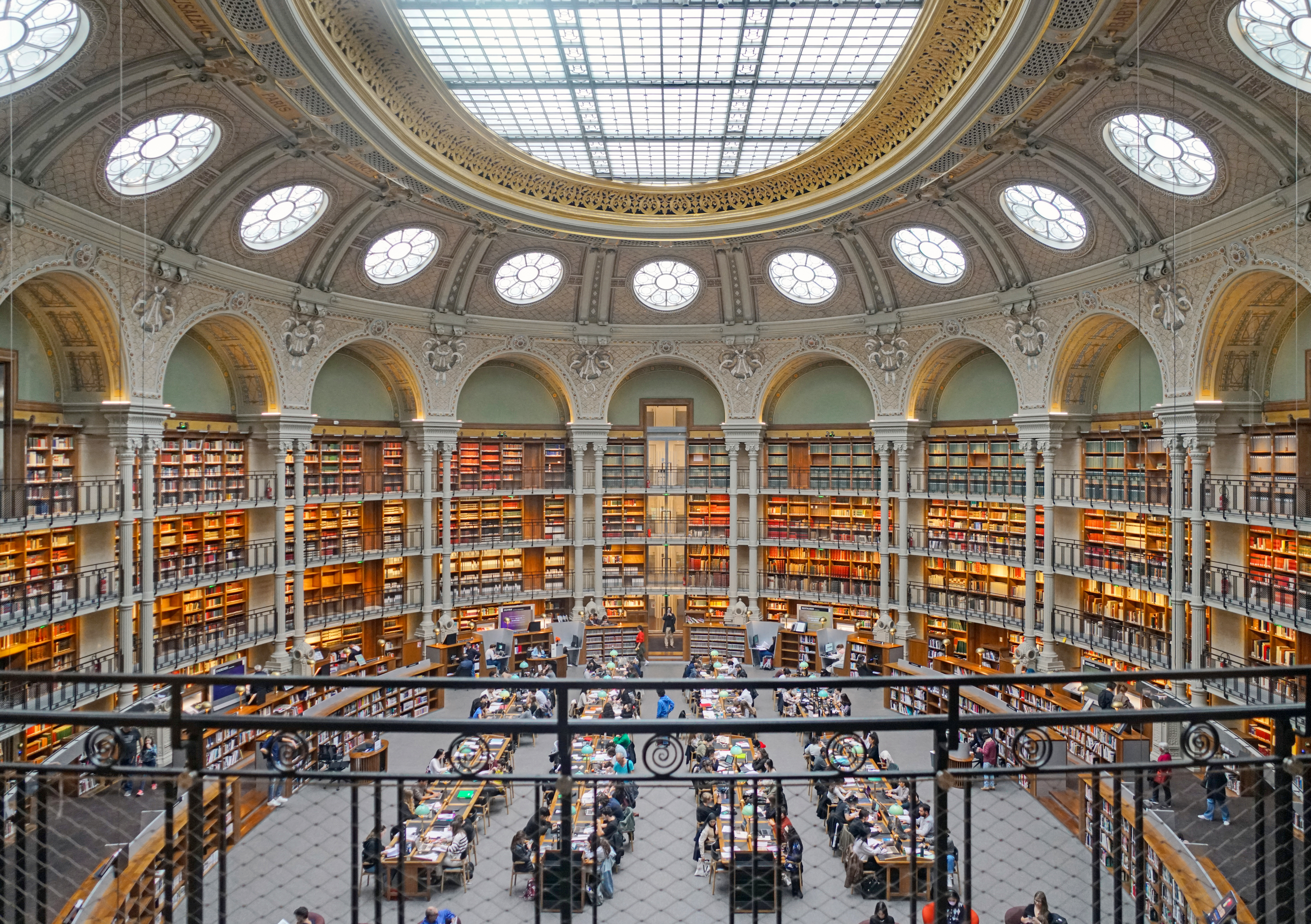
The Bibliothèque nationale de France, la Salle Ovale, in Paris

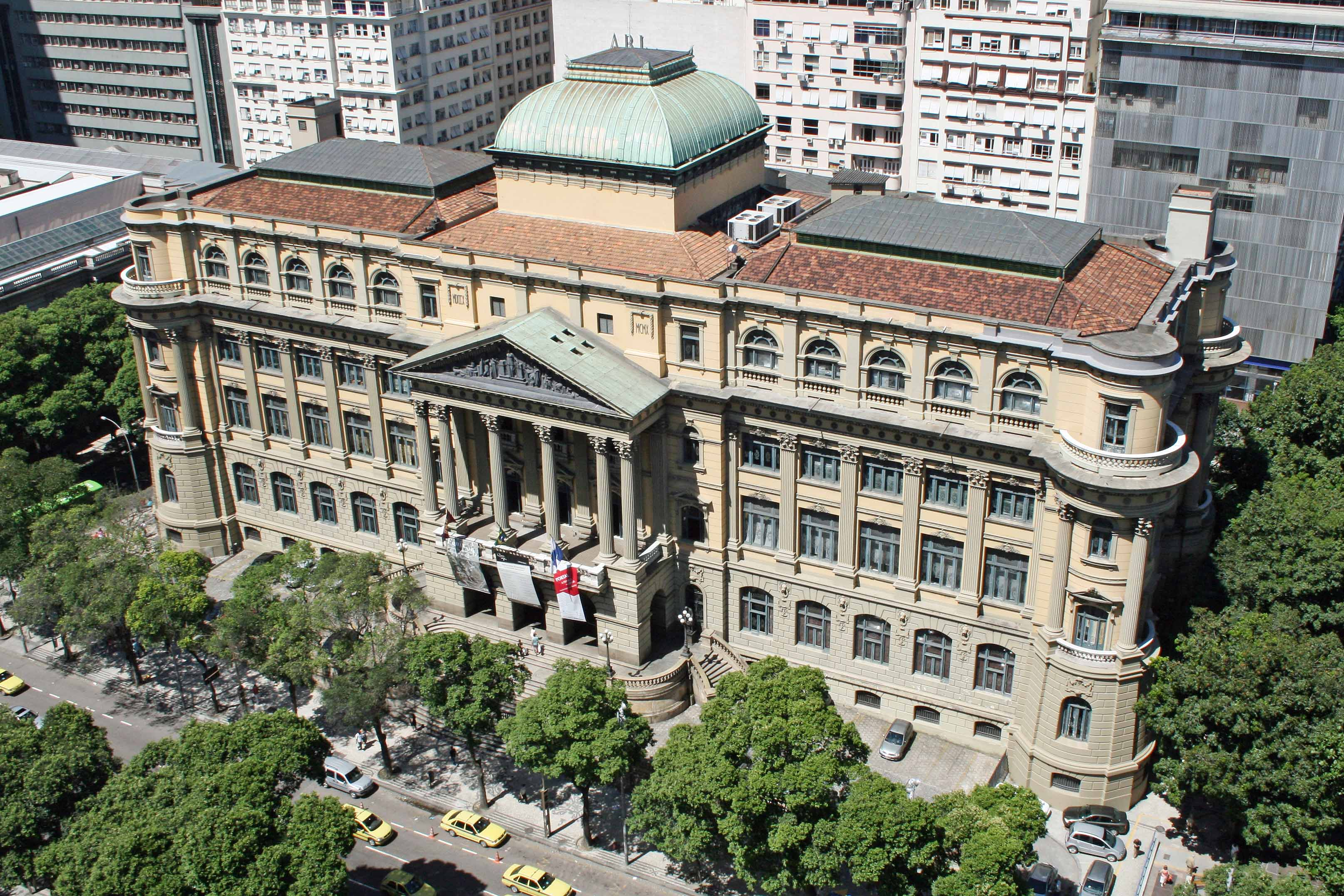
The National Library of Brazil is the largest library in Latin America.

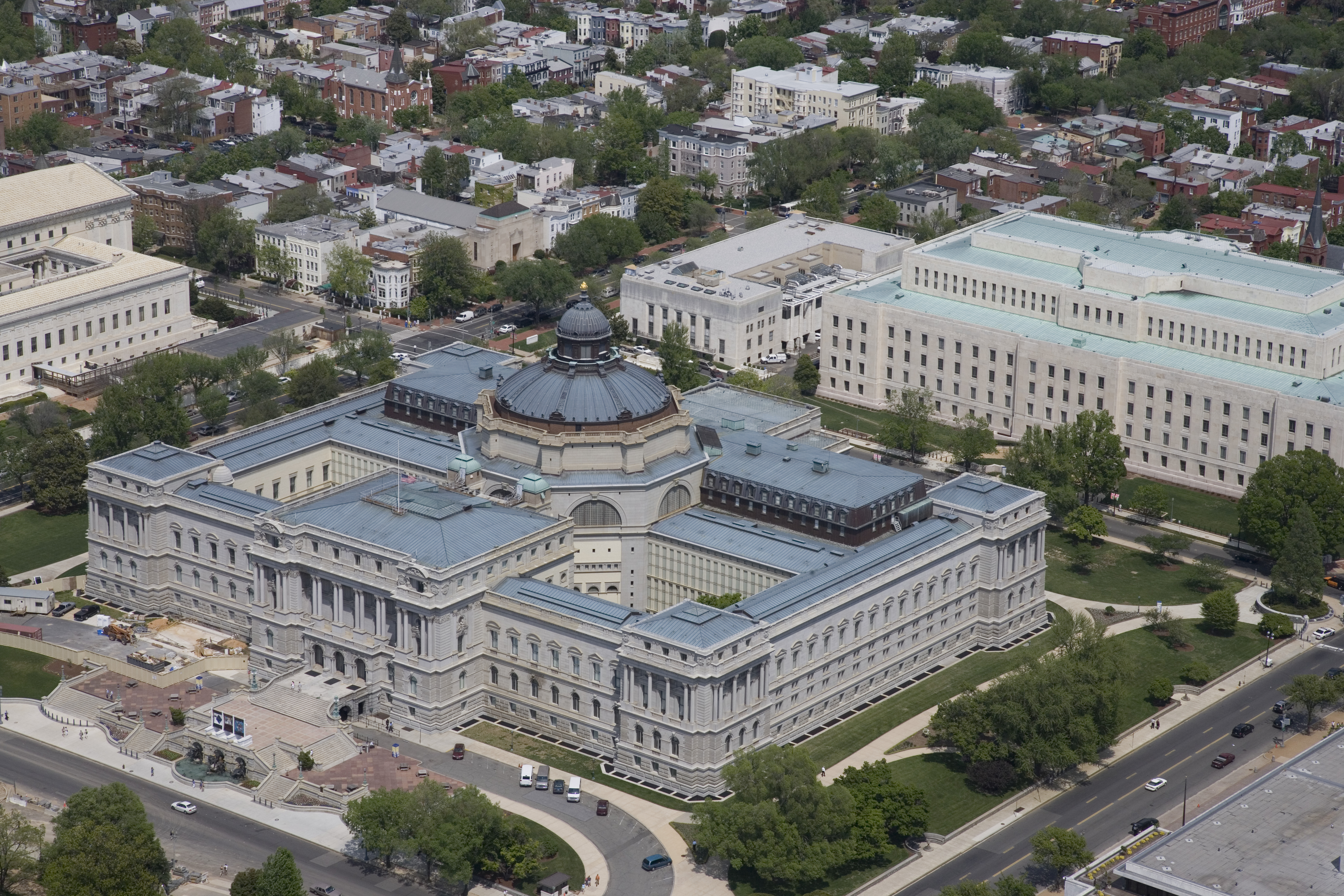
The Thomas Jefferson Building of the Library of Congress in Washington, DC

A national library is a library established by a government as a country's preeminent repository of information. Unlike public libraries, these rarely allow citizens to borrow books. Often, they include numerous rare, valuable, or significant works. A national library is that library which has the duty of collecting and preserving the literature of the nation within and outside the country. Thus, national libraries are those libraries whose community is the nation at large. Examples include the British Library in London, the Bibliothèque nationale de France in Paris, and the National Library of India in Kolkata.

There are wider definitions of a national library which put less emphasis on the repository character.

National libraries are usually notable for their size, compared to those of the other libraries in the same country. Some subnational states that wish to preserve their particular cultures have established comparable libraries with all the attributes of national libraries, such as with legal deposit.

Many national libraries cooperate within the National Libraries Section of the International Federation of Library Associations and Institutions (IFLA) to discuss their common tasks, define and promote common standards and carry out projects helping them to fulfill their duties. National libraries of Europe participate in The European Library. This is a service of The Conference of European National Librarians (CENL).

== History ==
=== Origins ===
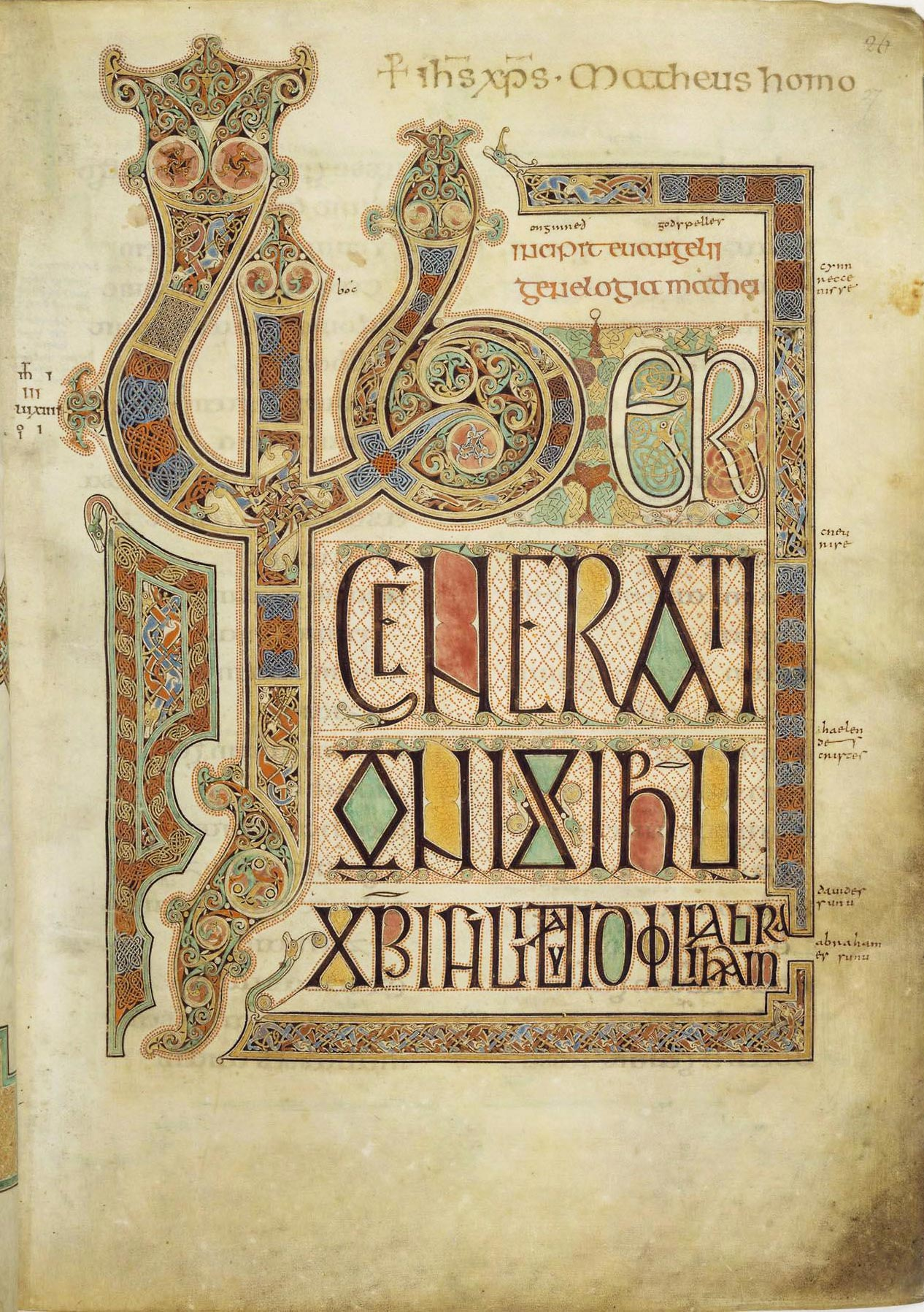
The Lindisfarne Gospels is but one of the treasures collected by Sir Robert Cotton.

The first national libraries had their origins in the royal collections of the sovereign or some other supreme body of the state.

One of the first plans for a national library was devised by the English mathematician John Dee, who in 1556 presented Mary I of England with a visionary plan for the preservation of old books, manuscripts and records and the founding of a national library, but his proposal was not taken up.

In England, Sir Richard Bentley's Proposal for Building a Royal Library published in 1694 stimulated renewed interest in the subject. Sir Robert Cotton, 1st Baronet, of Connington, a wealthy antiquarian, amassed the richest private collection of manuscripts in the world at the time and founded the Cotton Library. After the Dissolution of the Monasteries, many priceless and ancient manuscripts that had belonged to the monastic libraries began to be disseminated among various owners, many of whom were unaware of the cultural value of the manuscripts. Sir Robert's genius was in finding, purchasing and preserving these ancient documents. After his death his grandson donated the library to the nation as its first national library. This transfer established the formation of the British Library.

=== National libraries ===
==== United Kingdom ====
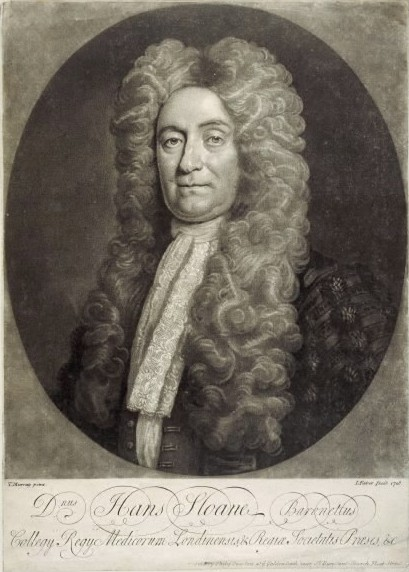
Sir Hans Sloane's collection of books and manuscripts was bequeathed to the British Museum.

The first true national library was founded in 1753 as part of the British Museum. This new institution was the first of a new kind of museum –national, belonging to neither church nor king, freely open to the public and aiming to collect everything. The museum's foundations lay in the will of the physician and naturalist Sir Hans Sloane, who gathered an enviable collection of curiosities over his lifetime which he bequeathed to the nation for £20,000.

Sloane's collection included some 40,000 printed books and 7,000 manuscripts, as well as prints and drawings. The British Museum Act 1753 also incorporated the Cotton library and the Harleian library. These were joined in 1757 by the Royal Library, assembled by various British monarchs.

The first exhibition galleries and reading room for scholars opened on 15 January 1759, and in 1757, King George II granted it the right to a copy of every book published in the country, thereby ensuring that the museum's library would expand indefinitely.

Anthony Panizzi became the Principal Librarian at the British Museum in 1856, where he oversaw its modernization. During his tenure, the library's holdings increased from 235,000 to 540,000 volumes, making it the largest library in the world at the time. Its famous circular Reading Room was opened in 1857. Panizzi undertook the creation of a new catalogue, based on the "Ninety-One Cataloguing Rules" (1841) which he devised with his assistants. These rules served as the basis for all subsequent catalogue rules of the 19th and 20th centuries, and are at the origins of the ISBD and of digital cataloguing elements such as Dublin Core.

==== France ====
In France, the first national library was the Bibliothèque Mazarine, which evolved from its origin as a royal library founded at the Louvre Palace by Charles V in 1368. At the death of Charles VI, this first collection was unilaterally bought by the English regent of France, the Duke of Bedford, who transferred it to England in 1424. It was apparently dispersed at his death in 1435. The invention of printing resulted in the starting of another collection in the Louvre inherited by Louis XI in 1461. Francis I transferred the collection in 1534 to Fontainebleau and merged it with his private library.

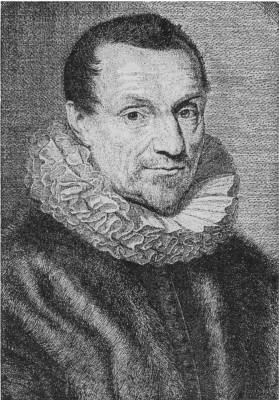
As librarian of the Bibliothèque Mazarine, Jacques Auguste de Thou transformed it into the largest library in the world at the time.

The appointment of Jacques Auguste de Thou as librarian in the 17th century, initiated a period of development that made it the largest and richest collection of books in the world. The library opened to the public in 1692, under the administration of Abbé Louvois, Minister Louvois's son. Abbé Louvois was succeeded by the Abbé Bignon, or Bignon II as he was termed, who instituted a complete reform of the library's system. Catalogues were made which appeared from 1739 to 1753 in 11 volumes. The collections increased steadily by purchase and gift to the outbreak of the French Revolution, at which time it was in grave danger of partial or total destruction, but owing to the activities of Antoine-Augustin Renouard and Joseph Van Praet it suffered no injury.

The library's collections swelled to over 300,000 volumes during the radical phase of the French Revolution when the private libraries of aristocrats and clergymen were seized. After the establishment of the French First Republic in September 1792, "the Assembly declared the Bibliotheque du Roi to be national property and the institution was renamed the Bibliothèque Nationale. After four centuries of control by the Crown, this great library now became the property of the French people."

==== Germany ====
Although Germany was only constituted as a state in 1871, the first national library was set up in the context of the German revolutions of 1848. Various booksellers and publishers offered their works to the Frankfurt Parliament for a parliamentary library. The library, led by Johann Heinrich Plath, was termed the Reichsbibliothek ("Reich library"). After the failure of the revolution the library was abandoned and the stock of books already in existence was stored at the Germanisches Nationalmuseum in Nuremberg. In 1912, the town of Leipzig, seat of the annual Leipzig Book Fair, the Kingdom of Saxony and the Börsenverein der Deutschen Buchhändler (Association of German booksellers) agreed to found a German National Library in Leipzig. Starting 1 January 1913, all publications in German were systematically collected (including books from Austria and Switzerland).

==== Spain ====
The library was founded by King Philip V in 1711 as the Royal Library or Palace Public Library. The Royal Letters Patent that he granted, the predecessor of the current legal deposit requirement, made it mandatory for printers to submit a copy of every book printed in Spain to the library. In 1836, the Crown transferred the library to the Ministry of Governance and it was renamed as National Library of Spain. A year later, women were allowed access to the library for the first time, after a petition from writer Antonia Gutiérrez was granted by Queen Regent Maria Christina.

==== Poland ====
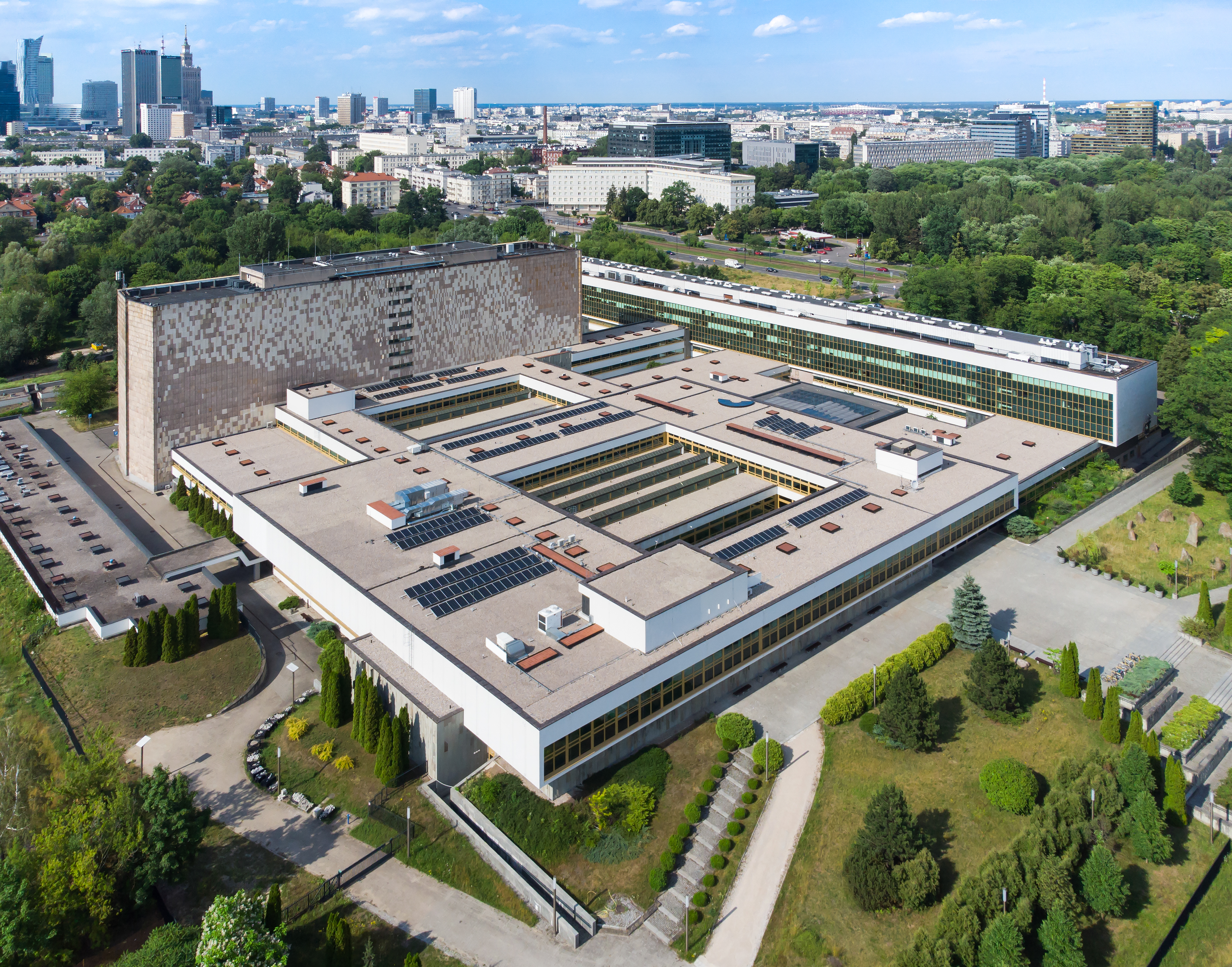
The National Library of Poland in Warsaw

The National Library of Poland continues the tradition of the Załuski Library. It was opened to readers in Warsaw on 8 August 1747, thanks to Józef Załuski's cooperation with his brother Andrzej Załuski, but the idea of the Library dates back to 1732 (presented in Programma literarium by Józef Załuski). The library was one of the first national libraries and largest public libraries of 18th-century Europe. Following the death of its founders the library became the property of the Polish state and from 1774 was named the Library of the Polish–Lithuanian Commonwealth (Polish: Biblioteka Rzeczypospolitej). In 1780, the Sejm of the Polish–Lithuanian Commonwealth granted the Library the right to receive a free legal deposit copy of every book printed in the country. Following the failed Kościuszko Uprising, on the eve of Third Partition of Poland and the collapse of Polish statehood, the library was closed and its contents were taken to St. Petersburg in 1794, where it formed the basis of the National Library of Russia. Before being confiscated, the collections numbered some 400,000 volumes, including 13,000 medieval and modern manuscripts.

Between 1795 and 1918 no central institution existed collecting printed and handwritten works from the lands that had once formed Poland. Some smaller libraries aimed to fill the gap it left, albeit on a smaller scale. The National Library was re-established as an institution after Poland regained its independence in 1918, and formally opened in 1928 under the Decree of the President of the Republic of Poland. The Polish-language books from the Załuski Collection (numbering some 55,000 titles) were returned to Poland by the Russian SFSR following the Treaty of Riga in 1921. The National Library of Poland also included the collections of other Warsaw-based libraries and the collections from Rapperswil and Paris created by Polish émigré communities. During World War II the most valuable part of the National Library's holdings—almost 800,000 registered items (including c. 50,000 manuscripts destroyed by Nazi Germany)—were lost forever.

==== Russia ====
The Imperial Public Library was established in 1795 by Catherine the Great, whose private collections included the domestic libraries of Voltaire and Diderot, which she had purchased from their heirs. Voltaire's personal library is still one of the highlights of the collection. The plan of a Russian public library was submitted to Catherine in 1766 but the Empress did not approve the project for the imperial library until 27 May [O.S. 16 May] 1795, eighteen months before her death. The cornerstone of the foreign-language department came from the Polish–Lithuanian Commonwealth after its fall.

==== United States ====
In the newly formed American republic, James Madison first proposed instituting a congressional library in 1783. The Library of Congress was established on 24 April 1800, when President John Adams signed an act of Congress providing for the transfer of the seat of government from Philadelphia to the new capital city of Washington. Part of the legislation appropriated $5,000 "for the purchase of such books as may be necessary for the use of Congress ... and for fitting up a suitable apartment for containing them." Books were ordered from London and the collection, consisting of 740 books and three maps, was housed in the new Capitol.

== Legal deposit and copyright ==
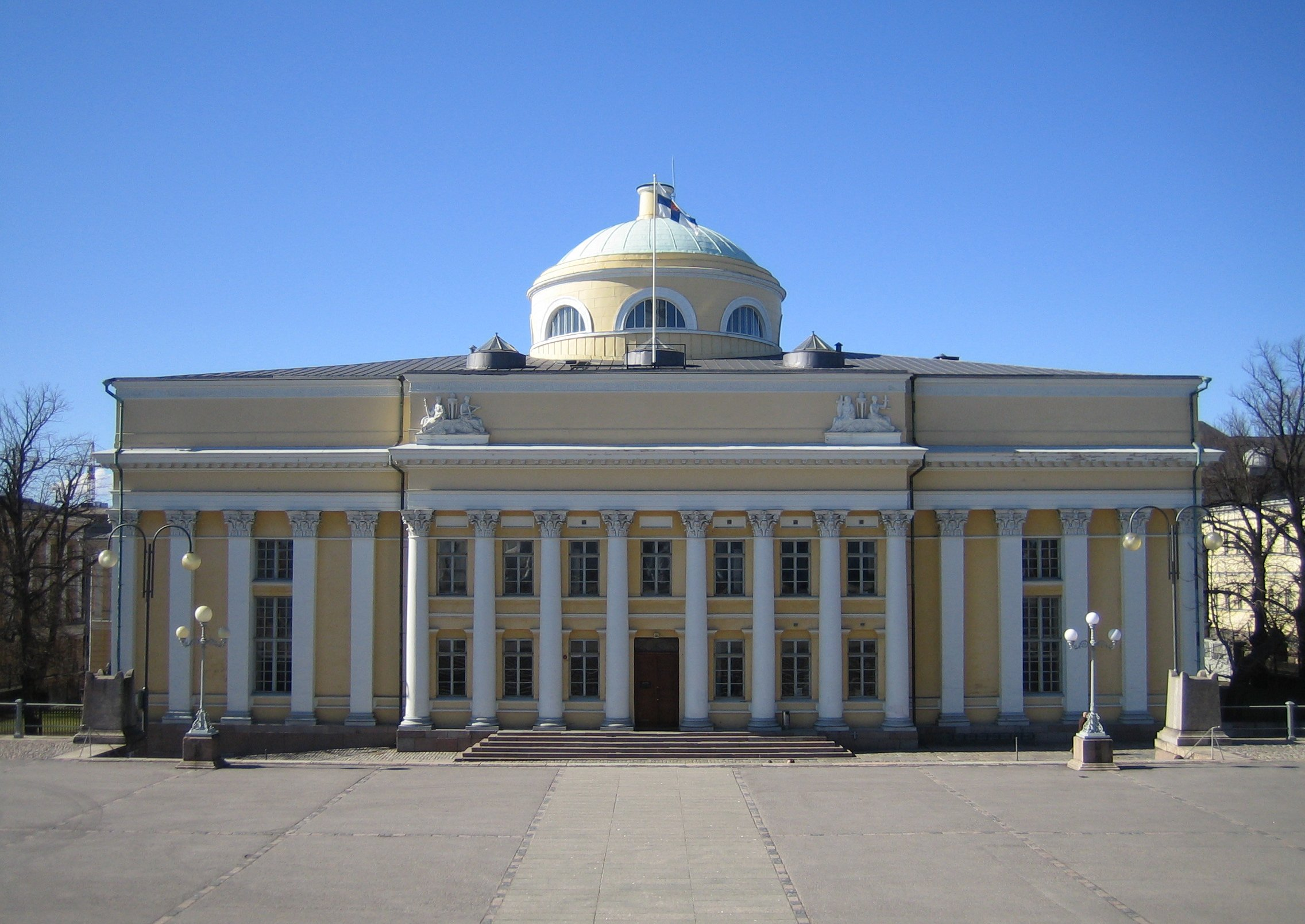
National Library of Finland, Helsinki

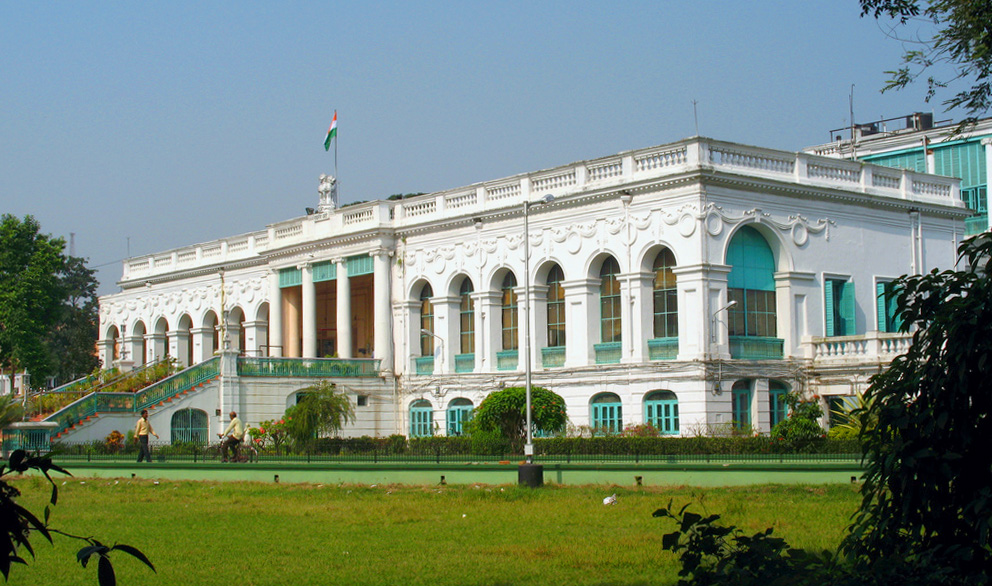
National Library of India, Kolkata

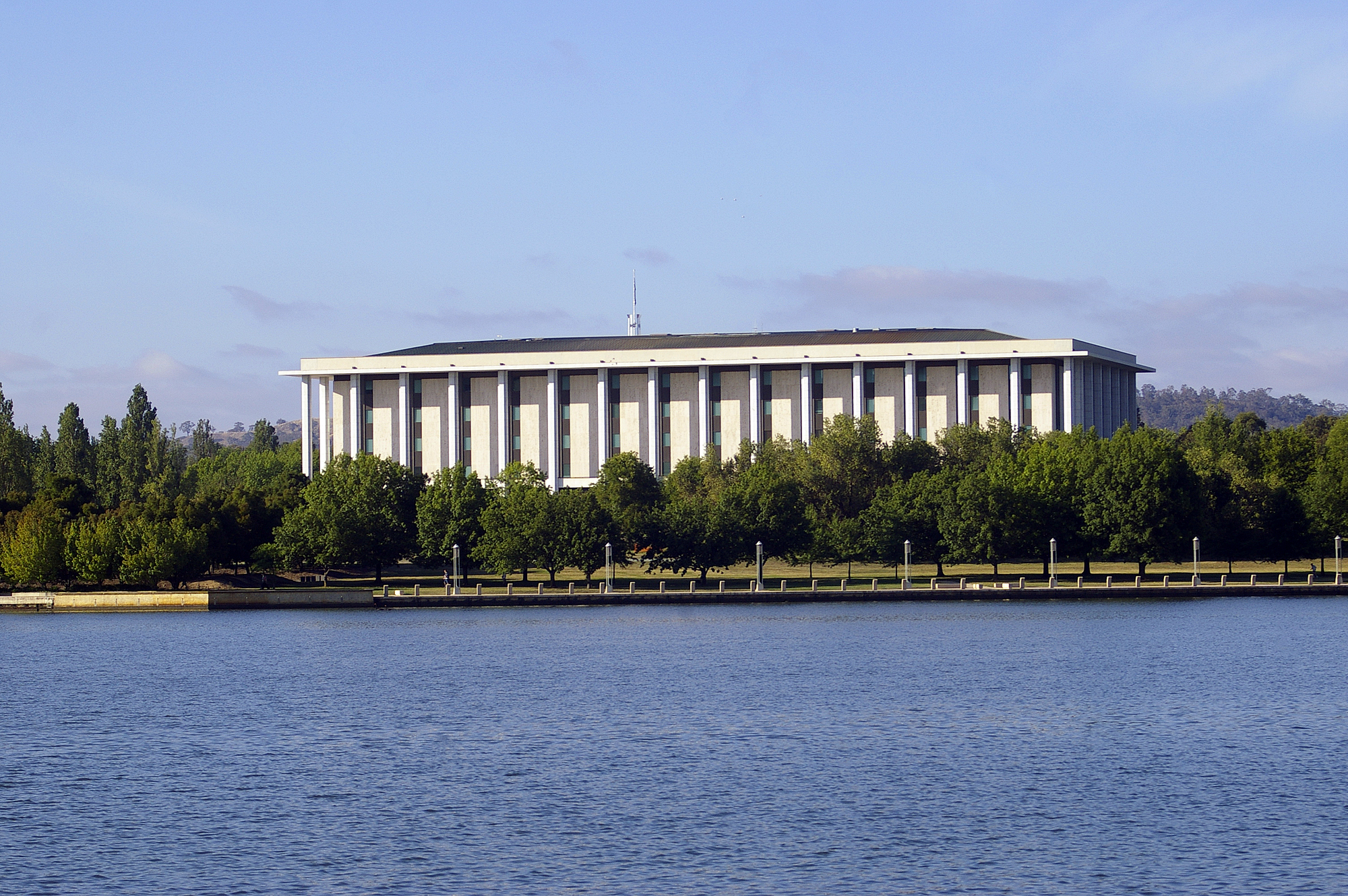
National Library of Australia as viewed from Lake Burley Griffin, Canberra

The principle of legal deposit applies in some countries.

In the United Kingdom, the Legal Deposit Libraries Act 2003 restates the Copyright Act 1911, that one copy of every book published there must be sent to the national library (the British Library); five other libraries (the Bodleian Library at Oxford University, the Cambridge University Library, the National Library of Scotland, the Trinity College Library, Dublin, and the National Library of Wales) are entitled to request a free copy within one year of publication. The international nature of the book publishing industry ensures that all significant English language publications from elsewhere in the world are also included.

In the Republic of Ireland, the Copyright and Related Rights Act 2000 specifies that one copy of every book published is to be delivered to the National Library of Ireland, the Trinity College Library, Dublin, the library of the University of Limerick, the library of Dublin City University, and the British Library. Four copies are to be delivered to the National University of Ireland for distribution to its constituent universities. Further, on demand in writing within twelve months of publication a copy is to be delivered to the Bodleian Library, Cambridge University Library, the National Library of Scotland, and the National Library of Wales.

In Australia, the Copyright Act 1968 and other state acts require that a copy of every book published in Australia be deposited with the National Library of Australia, the relevant state library for the state in which the book was published, and some states other libraries such as parliamentary and university libraries.

A similar system also exists in Canada with respect to its national library, known as Library and Archives Canada, and in Québec with respect to the National Library and Archives of Québec.

Since 1537, all works published in France must be deposited with the Bibliothèque nationale de France. Since 1997, it has also received deposits of digital works.

Since 1661, the Swedish Royal Library has been entitled to a copy of all works published in Sweden.

In Singapore, the National Library Board Act requires all publishers in Singapore to deposit two copies of every publication to the National Library Board at their own expense within four weeks from the publication date.

Other countries, like the United States, do not follow this requirement. The United States does, however, require that any publisher submit two copies of a copyrightable work to United States Copyright Office at the Library of Congress—mandatory deposit— but the Library is selective about which works it retains. The legal requirement of mandatory deposit was challenged in Valancourt Books v. Garland, with the court finding that requiring a publisher to deposit copies of its books at the Library of Congress was a violation of the Takings Clause. The international nature of the book publishing industry ensures that all significant English language publications from elsewhere in the world are also included. It also has the Federal depository libraries, which must receive a copy of all of the publications of the Government Printing Office.

In addition to having a law requiring publishers to deposit books, those countries with legal deposits usually have many other incentives for a proper and speedy deposit, such as a tie-in with laws affecting copyright of the same documents, and/or a cataloguing-in-publication (CIP) service.

Approximately three million new English-language books are retained by the British Library and Library of Congress each year.

== National bibliographic control ==
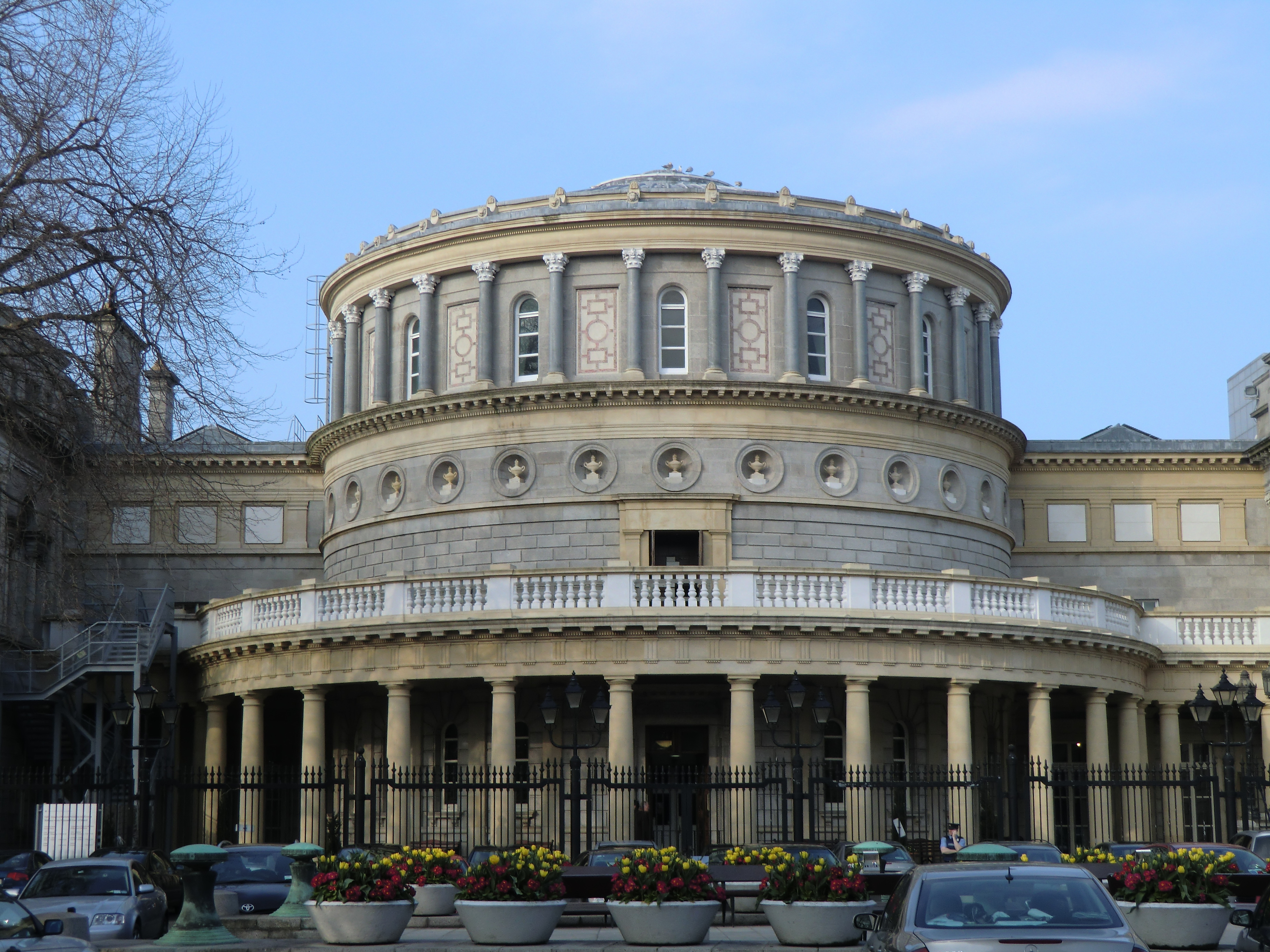
National Library of Ireland, Dublin

One of the main goals of a national library is fulfilling their nation's part of the common international goal of union cataloguing and/or universal bibliographic control, by ensuring the bibliographic control of all the books or book-like documents published in that particular country or talking about that particular country, in any way.

The first part of the goal is usually achieved through the means of legal deposit laws or (as is the case of the United States) by a host of different programs such as a cataloguing in publication service. By this service, the Library of Congress gives a complete catalogue entry of a book to any publisher who sends a final draft or some form of galley proof of a book currently in production. Other national libraries offer similar services or enforce mandatory practices similar to this.

The second part of the goal is achieved by thorough acquisition programs and collection development policies which target book markets in other nations, and which foster international agreements with other countries with national libraries who have national bibliographic control as one of their goals. Exchange and access protocols are defined permitting these countries to read each other's catalogues, and to standardize catalogue entries, thus making it easier for each national library to become aware of every possible published document which might concern their country.

== International bibliographic control ==
Another one of the main goals of many a national library is the "export aspect" and the collaborative sides of the universal bibliographic control of all the books in the world. This is done by the exchanges and accords mentioned in the previous section, and also by fostering the creation of standard conceptual tools such as library classification systems and cataloguing rules. The most commonly used of these tools is the International Standard Bibliographic Description or ISBD, which has served as a basis for national and international cataloguing codes, such as AACR2.

== See also ==
- List of national and state libraries
- Library assessment
- National archives
