= Igreja de Nossa Senhora da Conceição (Luanda) =

Church in Luanda, Angola

Coordinates: 8°48′58″S 13°13′59″E

Igreja de Nossa Senhora da Conceição was a church in Luanda, Angola.

Founded in 1583, it was the first Parish Church of Luanda, and was originally made from wooden pillars, plaster and mud, with a thatched roof. In 1653, work began on building a stronger church and it became the cathedral of the city until 1818, when it was replaced with Nossa Senhora do Carmo

By the beginning of 1818, only the tower remained of the former church; the site was transformed in 1881 into the .
