= National Museum of Slavery =

Museum in Luanda, Angola

Coordinates: 8.958°S 13.105°E

The National Museum of Slavery
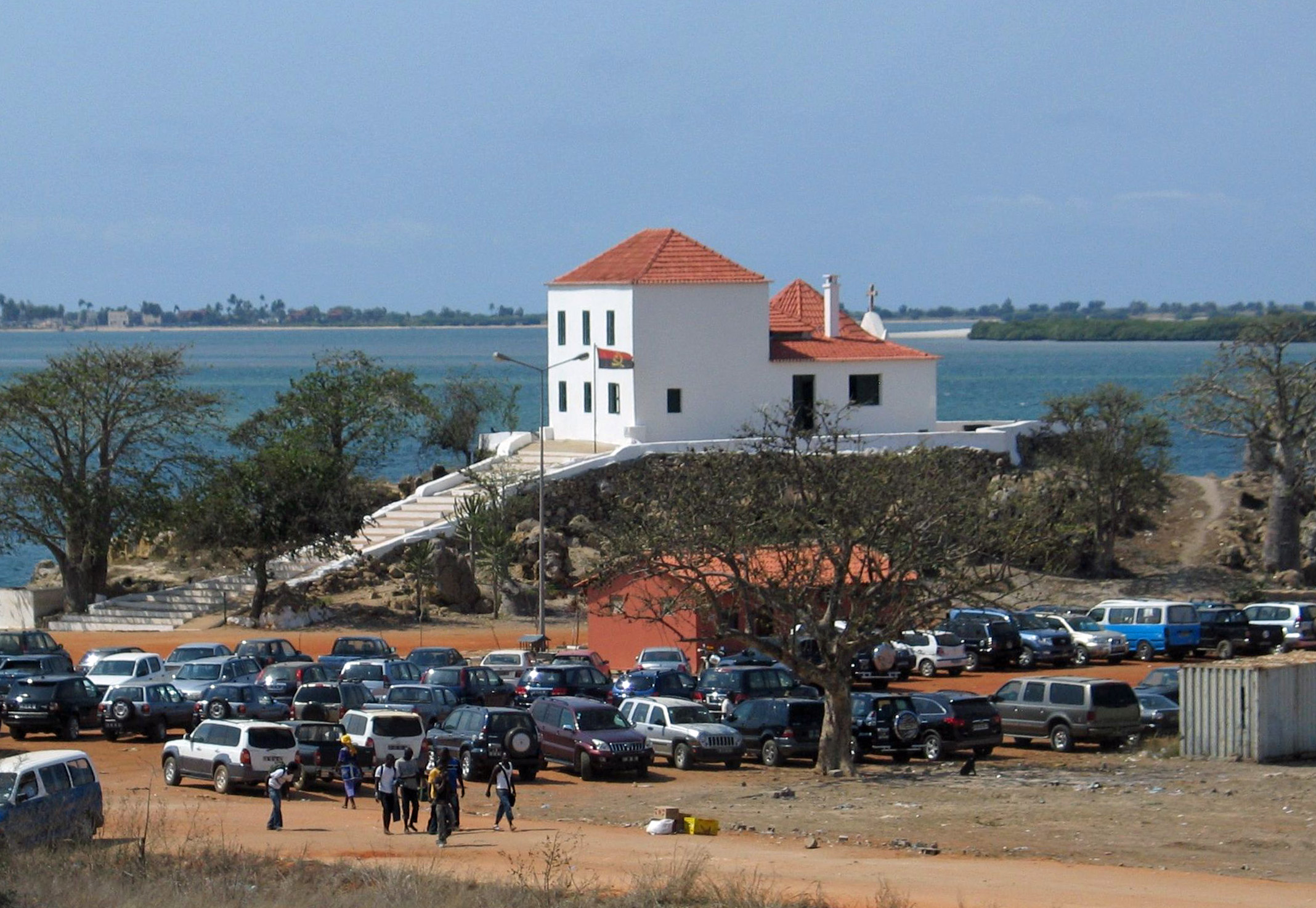

- Location within Angola
- Established: 1977
- Location: Morro da Cruz, Luanda, Angola
- Type: History of Slavery

The National Museum of Slavery (Portuguese: Museu Nacional da Escravatura) is located in Morro da Cruz, Luanda, Angola.

== History ==
The museum was founded in 1977 by the National Institute of Cultural Patrimony, with the objective of depicting the history of slavery in Angola. The museum adjoins the Capela da Casa Grande, a 17th-century structure where slaves were baptized before being put on slave ships for transport to the Americas.

The museum displays hundreds of items utilized in the slave trade, and is located in the former property of Álvaro de Carvalho Matoso, captain of the presidio of the Forte de Ambaca, Fortaleza da Muxima, and Forte de Massangano in Angola, and one of the largest slave-traders on the African coast in the first half of the 18th Century. Matoso died in 1798, and his family and heirs continued in the slave-trade until 1836, when a decree by Maria II of Portugal prohibited the export of slaves from the Portuguese Empire.

== Sources ==
- Museu da Escravatura conta com novos livros sobre a escravidão
- Reabertura do Museu Nacional da Escravatura em Angola
