= Fortress of São Francisco do Penedo =

Fortress in Luanda, Angola

- Portuguese: Forte de São Francisco do Penedo
- Luanda in Angola

Location
- Coordinates: 8.8014°S 13.25028°E

Site history
- Built: 1765
- Built by: Portuguese Empire

The Fortress of São Francisco do Penedo (Portuguese: Forte de São Francisco do Penedo) is located in the port city of Luanda, Angola.

== History ==
In the 17th century, by order of Philip II of Portugal, a Commission was created to study how the strategic port city of Luanda could be fortified.

One of the expected buildings to protect the city of Luanda, was the Fortress of Penedo. So, the Fortress would come to guarantee the safety of European occupation, giving resistance to the network of the traffic of the slaves, who were sent to America, from the harbour of Luanda.

The Fortress of Penedo was, since its first building, one of the keys of the Luanda harbour protection. And secretly it cantoned the slaves and assured their sending to the lands of "New World" (America).

The new fortress was built between 1765 and 1766, and was also used as a prison of the Portuguese Political Police.

This Fortress is badly preserved due to its age and its activity as a Prison.

== World Heritage Status ==
This site was added to the UNESCO World Heritage Tentative List on November 22, 1996, in the Cultural category.
