= Technical University of Angola =

Private university in Luanda, Angola

Coordinates: 8.8734°S 13.2843°E

The Technical University of Angola (Portuguese: Universidade Técnica de Angola also called UTANGA) is a higher education university in Luanda, Angola. It was founded in 2007.
