= Squatting in Angola =

Occupation of unused land or derelict buildings in Angola without permission of owner

Angola on globe

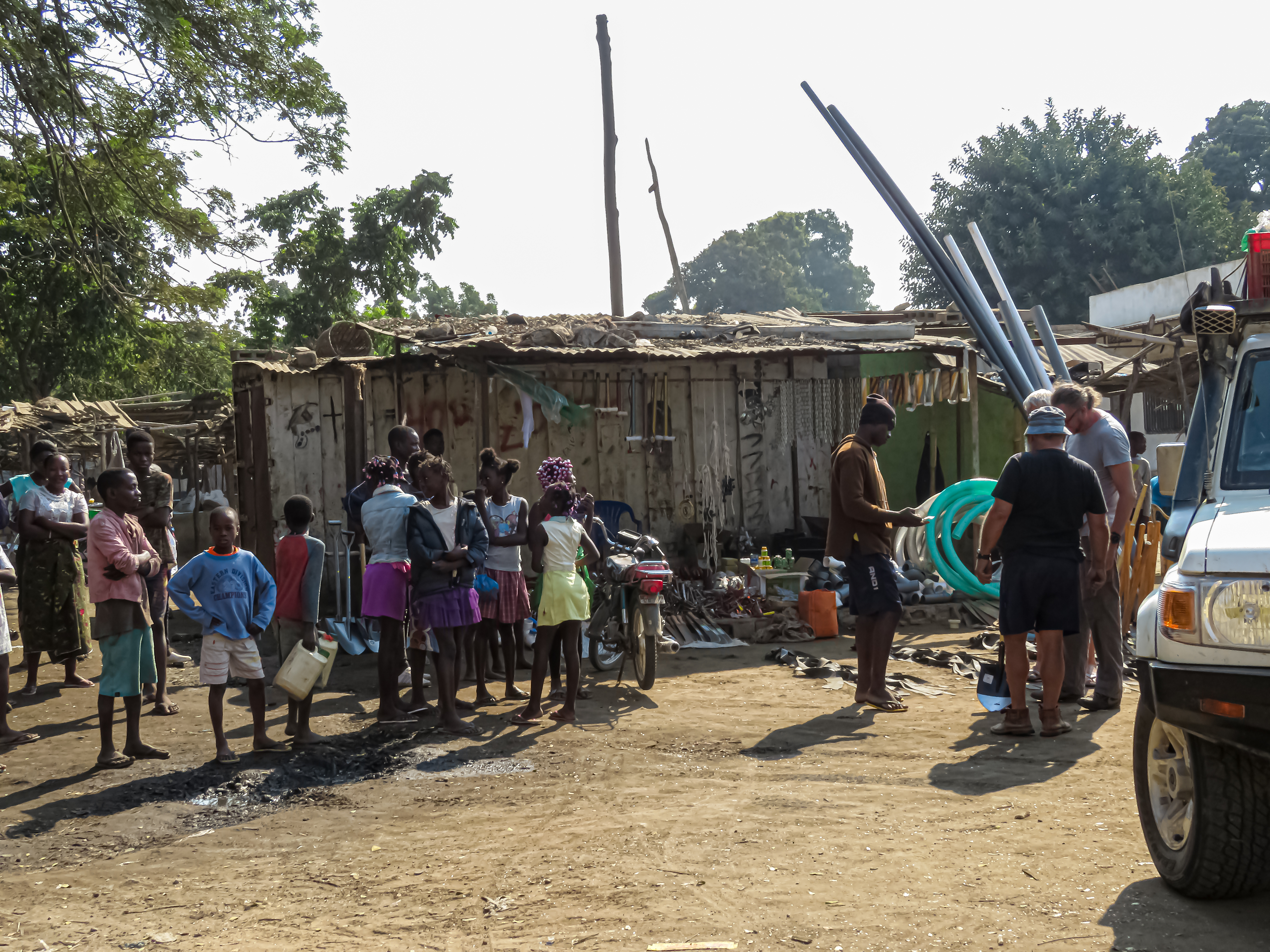
Shacks on periphery of Luanda

Squatting in Angola occurs when displaced peoples occupy informal settlements in coastal cities such as the capital Luanda. The Government of Angola has been criticized by human rights groups for forcibly evicting squatters and not resettling them.

== History ==
Between 1575 and 1975, Angolan territory was partially colonised as Portuguese Angola. In the late 18th-century and early 19-century, escaped slaves joined with bandits to attack the Portuguese. There was also resistance from indigenous peoples such as the Herero and the Nyaneka. The latter squatted ancestral lands after being displaced from them.

Angola became independent in 1975, then the Angolan Civil War began, lasting until 2002 and displacing an estimated 4 million people. In 1975, the capital Luanda had 0.5 million inhabitants and by 2011 its population was 10 million of which 7 million lived in slums scattered across the city. In these squatted informal settlements known as musseques, 55 per cent have electricity and 12.4 per cent have running water. War accelerated the process of urbanization since Luanda and other coastal cities were perceived to be safer places than the interior. The first slums dated back to the colonial era and since then more have been founded. Since 2002, a city-wide gentrification process in Luanda has led to evictions for shopping centres and luxury homes.

In 2007, Amnesty International and Christian Aid criticised the government for forcibly evicting squatters and not resettling them. In one instance, the Catholic church had requested that 2,000 families be removed. As well as occupying land, people also squatted buildings left derelict after being damaged in the civil war. Human Rights Watch recorded an eviction of at least 5,000 people in 2013 from a shanty town in Maiombe, Luanda.
