= Methodist University of Angola =

Private university in Luanda, Angola

- Universidade Metodista de Angola
- Established: 2007
- Location: Luanda, Angola
- Website: Official website

Methodist University of Angola (Portuguese: Universidade Metodista de Angola) is a private university located in Luanda, the capital of Angola.

It was founded in 2007.

== See also ==
- Schools in Luanda
