= Church and Convent of Nossa Senhora do Carmo =

Church in Luanda, Angola

Coordinates: 8°48′58″S 13°13′59″E

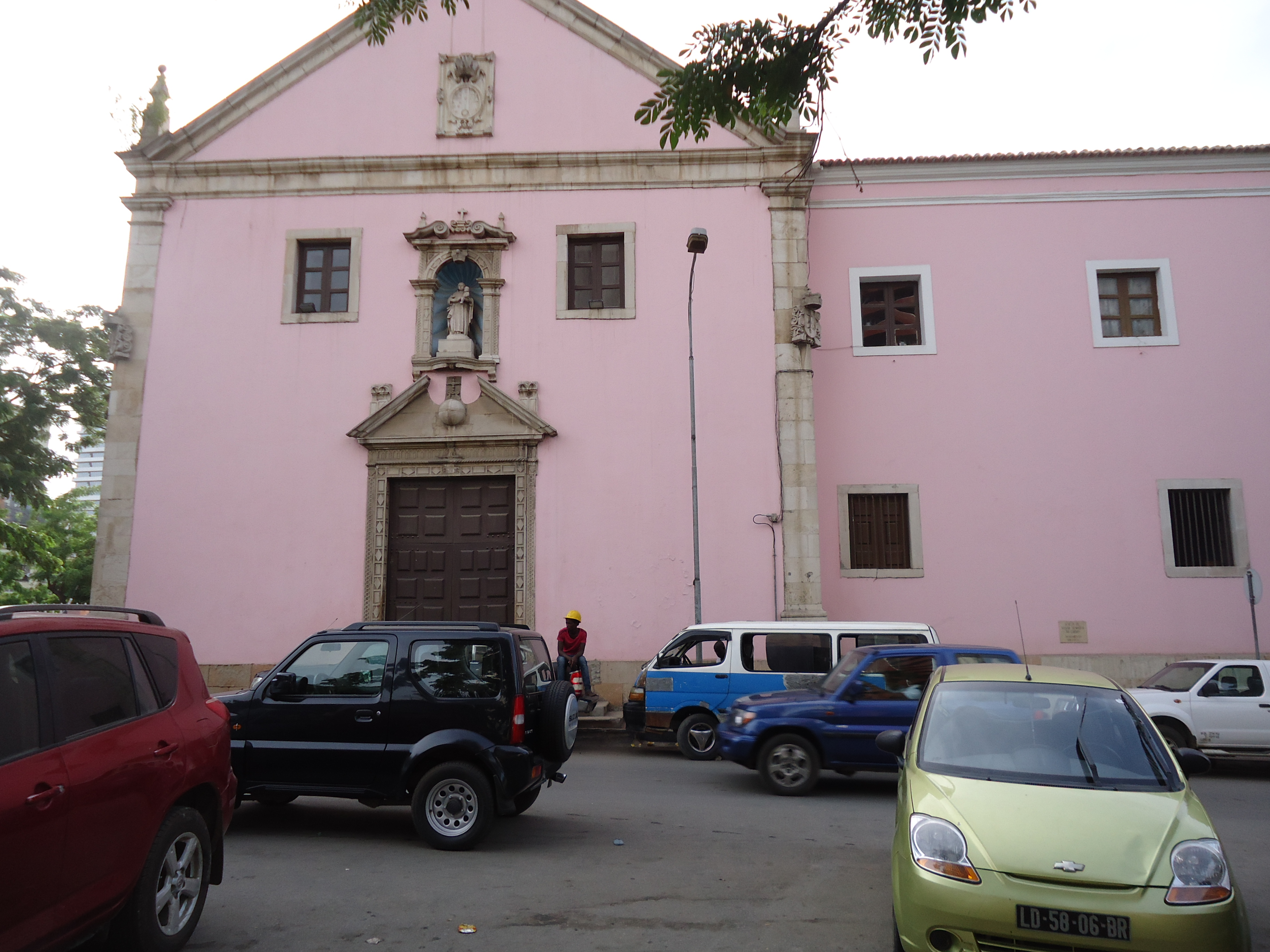
Igreja e Convento de Nossa Senhora do Carmo

Igreja e Convento de Nossa Senhora do Carmo (Church and Convent of Our Lady of Mount Carmel), also Igreja do Carmo or Carmo's Church, is a church and convent complex in Luanda, Angola. Thanks to its good condition, the church is considered to be one of the country's most important religious monuments.

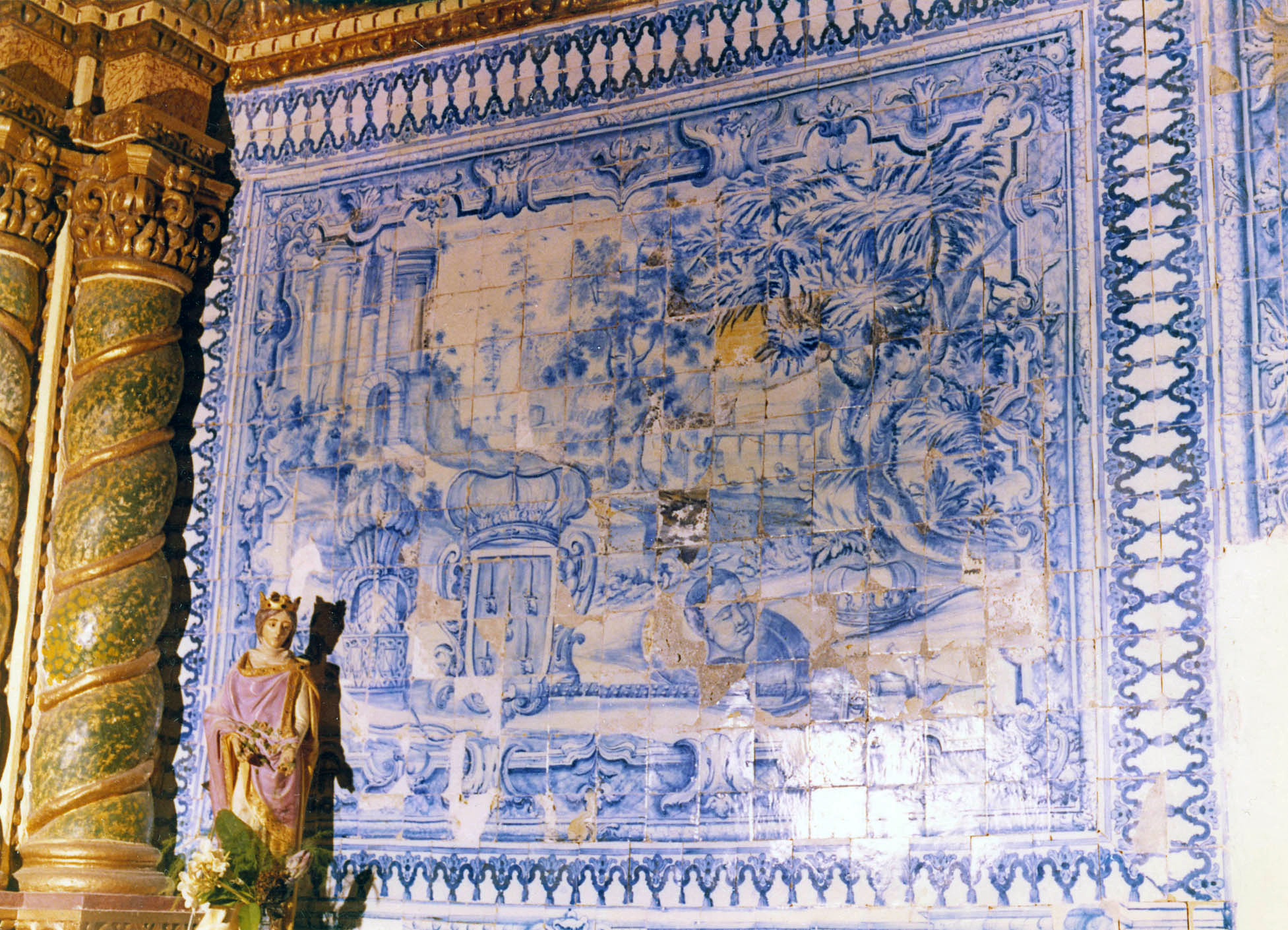
Interior decoration with Porto tiles

Under the patronage of Queen Luisa de Guzmán, the church was completed in 1689. It was built by the Carmelites who arrived in Luanda in 1659. The simple structure has a plain facade surmounted by a triangular gable. The building had seriously decayed by 1828 but was restored by Dominican priests. The interior is decorated with carved altars, gilded sculptures, frescos and Lisbon tilework.
