= Slavery in Angola =

Slavery in Angola existed since long before the late 15th century when Portugal established contacts with the peoples living in what is the Northwest of the present country, and founded several trade posts on the coast. A number of those peoples, like the Imbangala and the Mbundu, were active slave traders for centuries (see Slavery in Africa). In the late 16th century, Kingdom of Portugal's explorers founded the fortified settlement of Luanda, and later on minor trade posts and forts on the Cuanza River as well as on the Atlantic coast southwards until Benguela. The main component of their trading activities consisted in a heavy involvement in the Atlantic slave trade. Slave trafficking was abolished in 1836 by the Portuguese authorities.

== History ==
=== Trade and conquest ===
The Portuguese Empire conquered the Mbundu people of Angola, incorporating the local economy into the Atlantic slave trade. In 1610, Friar Luís Brandão, the head of Portuguese-run Luanda Jesuit college, wrote to a Jesuit who questioned the legality of the enslavement of native Angolans, saying, "We have been here ourselves for forty years and there have been many learned men here and in the province of Brazil who never have considered the trade illicit." He further stated that only a small number of Natives may have been enslaved illegally, and that the Portuguese at least converted them to Christianity. Angola exported slaves at a rate of 10,000 per year in 1612. The Portuguese built a new port in Benguela in 1616 to expand Portugal's access to Angolan slaves. From 1617 to 1621, during the governorship of Luís Mendes de Vasconcellos, up to 50,000 Angolans were enslaved and shipped to the Americas. The Vergulde Valck, Dutch slave-traders, bought 675 of the 1,000 slaves sold in Angola in 1660.

During at least the 18th and 19th centuries, Angola was the principal source of slaves who were forced into the Atlantic slave trade. A 1972 study estimated that over the years 1723-1771, approximately 203,000 slaves were exported from Luanda. Rio de Janeiro was the destination for more than half of those slaves. Between 3-6% of the slaves were children. Mortality at sea was 9.5% for adult slaves and 6.2% for child slaves.

=== Slavery ===
For several decades, slave trade with the Portuguese colony of Brazil was important in Portuguese Angola; Brazilian ships were the most numerous in the ports of Luanda and Benguela. This slave trade also involved local black merchants and warriors who profited from the trade. In the 17th century, the Imbangala became the main rivals of the Mbundu in supplying slaves to the Luanda market. In the 1750s the Portuguese sold 5,000 to 10,000 slaves annually, devastating the Mbundu economy and population.

The Portuguese gave guns to Imbangala soldiers in return for slaves. Armed with superior weapons, Imbangala soldiers captured and sold natives on a far larger scale as every new slave translated into a better-armed force of aggressors. A combined force of Portuguese and Imbangala soldiers attacked and conquered the Kingdom of Ndongo from 1618 to 1619, laying siege to the Ndongo capital of Kabasa. The Portuguese sold thousands of Kabasa residents with 36 ships leaving the port of Luanda in 1619, setting a new record, destined for slave plantations abroad. In the 18th century, war between the Portuguese, other European powers and several African tribes, gradually gave way to trade.

The great trade routes and the agreements that made them possible were the driving force for activities between the different areas; warlike tribal states become states ready to produce and to sell. In the Planalto (the high plains), the most important states were those of Bié and Bailundo, the latter being noted for its production of foodstuffs and rubber. The colonial power, Portugal, becoming ever richer and more powerful, would not tolerate the growth of these neighbouring states and subjugated them one by one, so that by the beginning of this century the Portuguese had complete control over the entire area.

From 1764 onwards, there was a gradual change from a slave-based society to one based on production for domestic consumption, and later for export. After the independence of Brazil from Portugal in 1822, the institution of slavery in Portugal's overseas possessions was abolished in 1836 by the Portuguese authorities.

Portugal banned slavery in their colonies in 1854 gradually, by declaring all existing slaves as free after a transition period of twenty years, and by 1878, all the slaves had transitioned to become free libertos; however, the vagrancy laws made the former slaves in danger of being forced by the government to work for private contractors until this was prohibited in 1910.

=== Forced labour ===
The Portuguese Empire first established a de jure system of forced labour known as chibalo throughout its colonies in 1899, but the Portuguese government did not implement the system in Angola until 1911 and abolished it in 1913. Republicans overthrew King Manuel II in a coup d'état in October 1910. Workers in Moçâmedes, among other cities in Angola, campaigned for abolition and manumission. In some areas forced labourers declared strikes, hoping the economic slowdown would force political changes. Carvalhal Correia Henriques, the new governor of Moçâmedes, supported their claims and directed labor complaints his way. The Portuguese First Republic, the new state, abolished forced labour again, but the employers whose businesses depended on forced labour used their political clout to lobby the Portuguese government to fire Henriques. The Portuguese government legalized forced labour in Angola again in 1911, dismissed Henriques in January 1912, and abolished the practice again in 1913.

In 1926, the 28 May 1926 coup d'état empowered António de Oliveira Salazar in Portugal. Later that year, Salazar reestablished forced labour, ordering colonial authorities to force nearly all adult, male Indigenous Peoples in Portugal's African colonies to work. The government told workers that they would only have to work for six months of every year. In practice, this obligation was a life sentence of forced labor. Civil rights for natives, no longer treated as natural law, had to be "earned" on a case-by-case basis under the designation of assimilade. Less than 1% of the native population ever achieved this designation. By 1947, 40% of workers died each year with a 60% infant mortality rate.

By 1940 the white population in Angola had risen to forty thousand, 2% of the population. Most of these émigrés, illiterate and landless, took the best farming land, regardless of availability, without compensating existing landowners. The authorities expelled natives, forcing them to harvest maize, coffee, and beans. Natives could "volunteer" to work on the plantations, voluntários, or face conscription, working for $1.50 per month as contratados. This system of forced labour prompted 500,000 Angolans to flee, creating a labor shortage, which in turn created the need for more workers for the colonial economy. By 1947, 40% of the forced labourers died each year with a 60% infant mortality rate in the territory (according to The World Factbook's 2007 estimates, infant mortality rate (deaths/1,000 live births) in modern-day Angola was 184.44—the worst result among all countries in the world). Historian Basil Davidson visited Angola in 1954 and found 30% of all adult males working in these conditions; "there was probably more coercion than ever before." Marcelo Caetano, Portugal's Minister of the Colonies, recognized the inherent flaws in the system, which he described as using natives "like pieces of equipment without any concern for their yearning, interests, or desires". Parliament held a closed session in 1947 to discuss the deteriorating situation. Henrique Galvão, Angolan deputy to the Portuguese National Assembly, read his "Report on Native Problems in the Portuguese Colonies". Galvão condemned the "shameful outrages" he had uncovered, the forced labour of "women, of children, of the sick, [and] of decrepit old men." He concluded that in Angola, "only the dead are really exempt from forced labor." The government's control over the natives eliminated the worker-employer's incentive to keep his employees alive because, unlike in other colonial societies, the state replaced deceased workers without directly charging the employer. The Portuguese government refuted the report and arrested Galvão in 1952. In 1961, Galvão was involved in the hijacking of a Portuguese luxury cruise liner.

=== Baixa de Cassanje revolt ===
Workers employed by Cotonang, a Portuguese-Belgian cotton plantation company, revolted on January 3, 1961, calling on the Portuguese to improve their working rights and leave Angola. The revolt, commonly considered the first battle of the Angolan War of Independence, ended in a blood bath.

Native protesters attacked São Paulo fortress, the largest prison and military establishment in Luanda, trying to free the prisoners and killing seven policemen. The Portuguese authorities killed forty attackers before gangs of white Angolans committed random acts of violence against the ethnic majority.

Portuguese authorities killed 49 people on February 5. On February 10, Portuguese authorities suppressed another unsuccessful attempt at freeing the prisoners. Bakongo farmers and coffee plantation workers revolted on March 15, near Baixa de Cassanje, killing white Angolans and black workers, burning plantations, bridges, government facilities, and police stations, and destroying barges and ferries. The Portuguese Air Force responded by bombing a 320-kilometre (200 mi) area with napalm killing 20,000 people, including 750 white Angolans, within the first six months of 1961.

The Portuguese Army and Air Force put down the uprising and blacked out the incident to the press. The People's Movement for the Liberation of Angola (MPLA) said the Portuguese military killed ten thousand people in the massacre. Conservative estimates are around 400 casualties. These events are considered the beginning of the Portuguese Colonial War (1961–1974).

== After independence from Portugal ==
Following Angola's independence from Portugal in 1975, during the Angolan Civil War (1975–2002), both the largest opposition group, National Union for the Total Independence of Angola (UNITA), and the government, used child soldiers in the civil war. It is estimated that as many as 11,000 children were involved in the last years of the fighting.

In current day Angola, high levels of child trafficking, commercial sexual exploitation, pornography, forced labor, sexual slavery, and other forms of exploitation are reported, in part due to the civil war–caused break down of social structures and traditional security mechanisms active before independence. Angola is a source country for significant number of men, women and children trafficked for the purposes of forced labor or sexual exploitation. Children have been trafficked internally and also to Namibia and South Africa for the purposes of sexual exploitation and domestic and commercial labor. The Government of Angola does not fully comply with the minimum standards for the elimination of trafficking.

== See also ==
- Atlantic slave trade
- History of Angola
- Imbangala
- Mbundu
- Slavery in Mauritania
- Slavery in Sudan
