= Timeline of Luanda =

Luanda is the capital and largest city of Angola. Located on Angola's northern Atlantic coast, it is the country's primary port, and its major industrial, cultural and urban centre. Among the oldest colonial cities of Africa, Luanda was founded in January 1576 as São Paulo da Assunção de Loanda by Portuguese explorer Paulo Dias de Novais.

== 16th–18th centuries ==
- 1530s – "Portuguese establish a slave-trading station."
- 1575 – Church built on Ilha de Luanda.
- 1576
  - São Paulo da Assumpção de Loanda founded by Portuguese Paulo Dias de Novais.
  - Fortress of São Miguel built.
- 1605 – Settlement recognized as a city.
- 1618 – Fortaleza São Pedro da Barra built.
- 1623 – Jesuit college founded.
- 1634 – Fortress of São Miguel rebuilt.
- 1641 – Capture of Luanda by Dutch.
- 1648 – Returned to being a Portuguese possession.
- 1679 – Cathedral of Luanda built.
- 1684 – Bishop's seat relocated to Luanda from São Salvador.
- 1764 – Arquivo Historico de Angola organized.
- 1766 – Fortress of São Francisco do Penedo rebuilt.
- 1769 – Aula de Geometria e Fortificacao (educational institution) founded.
- 1781 – Population: 9,755.
- 1796 – Population: 7,204.

== 19th century ==
- 1816 – Population: 4,689.
- 1836 – Slave trade declared illegal.
- 1844
  - Port opens to foreign shipping.
  - Population: 5,605.
- 1850 – Population: 12,565.
- 1865 – Banco Nacional Ultramarino branch opens.
- 1873 – Biblioteca Municipal established.
- 1881 – O Echo de Angola begins publication.
- 1889 – Luanda Railway and aqueduct begin operating.
- 1896 – Palácio de Ferro (iron palace) assembled.

== 20th century ==
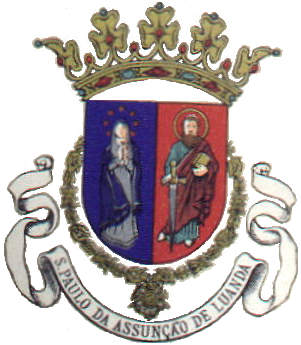
Portuguese coat of arms of the city of Luanda

- 1908 – Voz de Angola newspaper begins publication.
- 1910 – Population: 15,000 (approximate).
- 1913 – Angolan League founded in Luanda.
- 1923 – A Provincia de Angola newspaper begins publication.
- 1930 – Diario de Luanda newspaper begins publication.
- 1940
  - Roman Catholic Archdiocese of Luanda established.
  - Population: 61,028.
- 1942 – Liceu Salvador Correia de Sa (school) built.
- 1950 – Population: 141,647.
- 1951 – Mensagem literary magazine begins publication.
- 1954 – General Craveiro Lopes Airport inaugurated.
- 1956
  - Museu Nacional de História Natural de Angola (Natural History Museum of Angola) built.
  - People's Movement for the Liberation of Angola headquartered in Luanda.
- 1958 – Petroleum refinery built by Fina Petroleos de Angola.
- 1960 – Population: 224,540.
- 1962 – Estudos Gerais Universitários de Angola founded.
- 1964 – Cine Atlântico (cinema) built.
- 1969 – National Library of Angola founded.
- 1970 – Population: 475,328 urban agglomeration.
- 1975
  - June: Angolan Civil War begins.
  - 11 November: City becomes part of independent Republic of Angola.
  - União dos Escritores Angolano (writer's union) established.
  - Televisao Publica de Angola headquartered in city.
- 1976
  - Museu Nacional de Antropologia (National Anthropology Museum) and Grupo Desportivo Interclube football club founded.
  - National Bank of Angola headquartered in city.
- 1978 – Angola Red Cross and Cinemateca Nacional de Angola headquartered in city.
- 1979
  - University of Angola established.
  - 17 September: Funeral of Agostinho Neto.
- 1980 – Empresa de Electricidade de Luanda (electricity company), Atlético Petróleos de Luanda football club, and National Centre for Historical Documentation and Research established.
- 1981 – August–September: Central African Games held in city.
- 1985 – City joins the newly formed União das Cidades Capitais Luso-Afro-Américo-Asiáticas.
- 1988 – Elinga Theater established.
- 1989 – October: International Países Africanos de Língua Oficial Portuguesa meets in Luanda.
- 1991 – October: UNITA headquarters relocated to Luanda from Jamba.
- 1992
  - Luanda Antena Comercial (radio) begins broadcasting.
  - 30 October-1 November: Three Day War.
- 1993 – Population: 1,822,407 (urban agglomeration).
- 1997
  - Jornal do Rangel newspaper begins publication.
  - National Museum of Slavery founded.
- 1999
  - Catholic University of Angola and Cha de Caxinde publishing firm founded.
  - January: UNITA-R congress held in city.
- 2000 – Population: 2,591,000 (urban agglomeration).

== 21st century ==
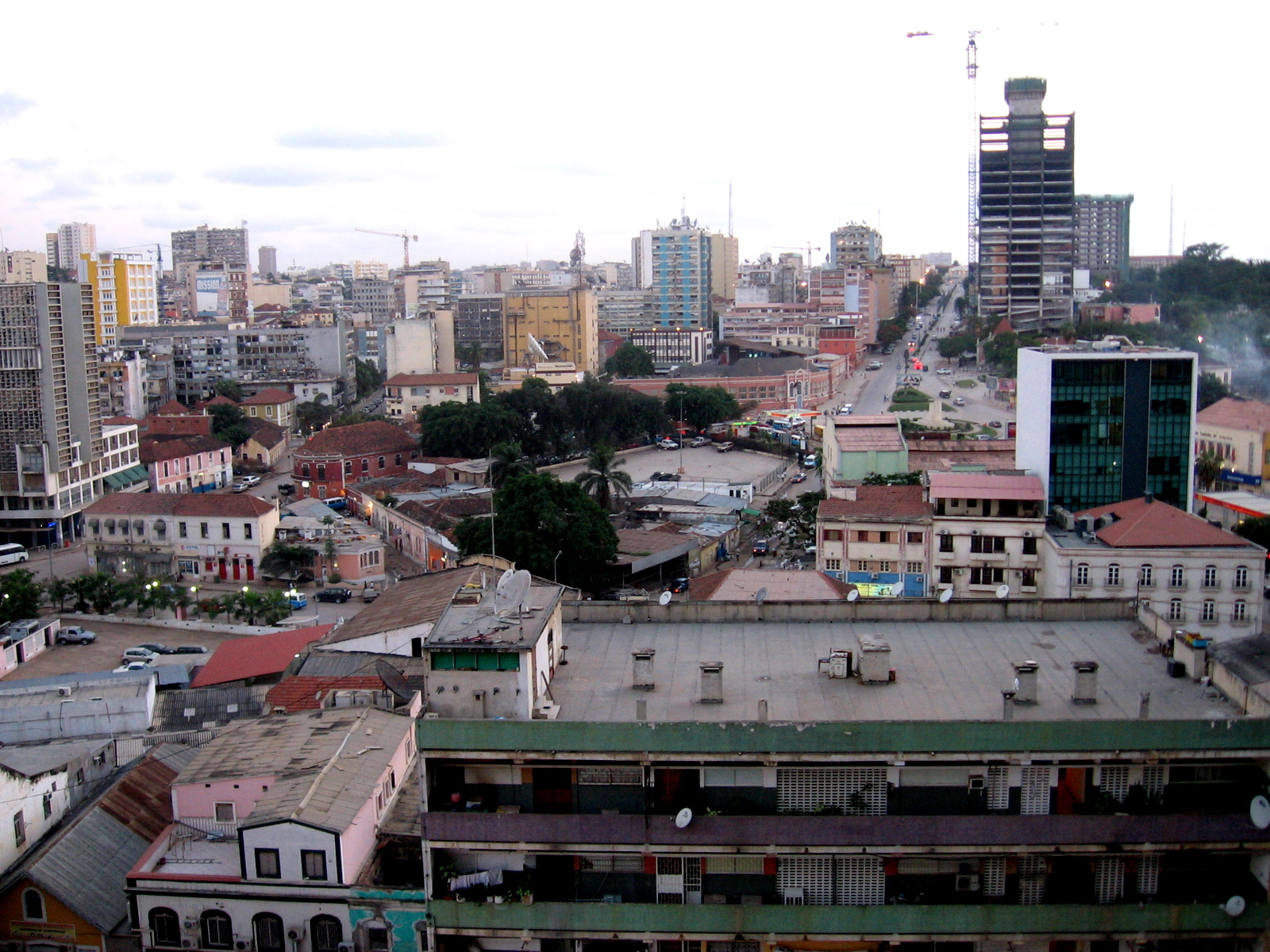
View of Luanda, 2007

- 2001 – Boa Vista shantytown residents evicted.
- 2003 – Estádio Joaquim Dinis built.
- 2005 – Population: 3,533,000 (urban agglomeration).
- 2006 – African Diamond Producers Association headquartered in city.
- 2007
  - Feira Internacional de Luanda (international fair) established.
  - January: Flooding.
  - Edificio GES, Edificio Sonangol, and Torres Atlantico towers built.
- 2008 – Construction of Angola International Airport begins.
- 2009
  - Estádio 11 de Novembro opens.
  - Luanda International Jazz Festival begins.
  - March: Catholic pope visits city; stampede at Estádio dos Coqueiros.
  - Francisca Espírito Santo becomes governor of Luanda Province (approximate date).
- 2010
  - Luanda Railway resumes operating.
  - Edificio Zimbo Tower built.
- 2011
  - Intercontinental Hotel built.
  - Jose Maria dos Santos becomes governor of Luanda Province (approximate date).
  - Population: 5,068,000.
- 2012
  - Angola Sovereign Wealth Fund headquartered in city.
  - Political protest.
  - Kilamba housing development built near city.
- 2013 – 1 January: Stampede at Estádio da Cidadela.
- 2014 – Graciano Francisco Domingos becomes governor of Luanda Province (approximate date).
- 2018 – Population: 2,487,444 (estimate, urban agglomeration).
- 2021 – Lusophony Games to be held in Luanda.

== See also ==
- Luanda history
- History of Luanda (in Portuguese)
- List of newspapers in Luanda
- List of colonial governors of Angola, headquartered in Luanda (until 1975)
- Timeline of Benguela

== Bibliography ==
=== Published in 19th century ===
- Richard Brookes (1820), "Loanda", The General Gazetteer (17th ed.), London: F.C. and J. Rivington
- "Loanda". Brockhaus' Konversations-Lexikon (in German) (14th ed.). Leipzig: Brockhaus. 1898.

=== Published in 20th century ===
- Esteves Pereira; Guilherme Rodrigues, eds. (1909). "Loanda". Portugal: Diccionario Historico... (in Portuguese). Vol. 4. Lisbon: Joao Romano Torres. hdl:2027/gri.ark:/13960/t1xd4tg47. OCLC 865826167.
- "Loanda" . Encyclopædia Britannica. Vol. 16 (11th ed.). 1910. pp. 834–835.
- C. R. Boxer (1965), Portuguese society in the tropics: the municipal councils of Goa, Macao, Bahia, and Luanda, 1510–1800, Madison: University of Wisconsin Press, OCLC 518169
- Ilídio do Amaral [in Portuguese] (1968). Luanda: estudo de geografia urbana (in Portuguese). Lisboa.
- Michael Hugo-Brunt (1968), "Angola", Portuguese Planning and Architecture on the Sea Route to the Orient, Exchange Bibliography, US: Council of Planning Librarians, pp. 536–589, ISSN 0010-9959 (Includes Luanda)
- Joseph C. Miller (1974). "The Archives of Luanda, Angola". International Journal of African Historical Studies. 7.
- Ilídio do Amaral (1983). "Luanda e os seus 'muceques', problemas de Geografia usbuna". lt=Finisterra |Finisterra (journal) (in Portuguese). 18. Centro de Estudos Geográficos da Universidade de Lisboa. ISSN 0430-5027.
- David Birmingham (1988). "Carnival at Luanda". Journal of African History. 29.
- M.C. Mendes (1988). "Slum Housing in Luanda". In Robert A. Obudho and Constance C. Mhlanga (ed.). Slum and squatter settlements in Sub-Saharan Africa: toward a planning strategy. Praeger.
- Christine Messiant (1989). "Luanda 1945–1961: colonises, societe coloniale et engagement nationaliste". In M. Cahen (ed.). Bourgs et Villes en Afrique Lusophone (in French).
- L. Colaco (1992). "Luanda: Contexto Demografico e Desigualdades Espaciais". Cadernos Populacao e Desenvolvimento (in Portuguese). 1.
- José C. Curto (1992). "A Quantitative Reassessment of the Legal Portuguese Slave Trade from Luanda, Angola, 1710–1830". African Economic History. 20.
- P. Jenkins; et al. (1992). "City Profile: Luanda". Cities. 19. doi:10.1016/s0264-2751(02)00010-0.
- José C. Curto (1999). "Anatomy of a Demographic Explosion: Luanda, 1844-1850". International Journal of African Historical Studies. 32 (2/3): 381–405. doi:10.2307/220347. JSTOR 220347. PMID 21812156.

=== Published in 21st century ===
2000s

- José C. Curto; Raymond R. Gervais (2001). "Population History of Luanda during the Late Atlantic Slave Trade, 1781-1844" (PDF). African Economic History. 29 (29): 1–59. JSTOR 3601706 – via New York Public Library.
- Paul Robson (2001). "Communities and Community Institutions in Luanda, Angola". In Arne Tostensen; et al. (eds.). Associational Life in African Cities: Popular Responses to the Urban Crisis. Sweden: Nordiska Afrikainstitutet. p. 250+. ISBN 978-91-7106-465-3.
- Paul Tiyambe Zeleza; Dickson Eyoh, eds. (2003). "Luanda, Angola". Encyclopedia of Twentieth-Century African History. Routledge. ISBN 0415234794.
- Marissa J. Moorman (2004). "Dueling Bands and Good Girls: Gender, Music, and Nation in Luanda's Musseques, 1961-1974". International Journal of African Historical Studies. 37.
- Marissa Moorman (2004). "Putting on a Pano and Dancing Like Our Grandparents: Nation and Dress in Late Colonial Luanda". In Jean Allman (ed.). Fashioning Africa: Power and the Politics of Dress. Bloomington: Indiana University Press. ISBN 9780253111043.
- Kevin Shillington, ed. (2005). "Luanda". Encyclopedia of African History. Fitzroy Dearborn. ISBN 978-1-57958-245-6.
- Cristina Udelsmann Rodrigues (2007). "From Family Solidarity to Social Classes: Urban Stratification in Angola (Luanda and Ondjiva)". Journal of Southern African Studies. 33.
- Marissa J. Moorman (2008). Intonations: A Social History of Music and Nation in Luanda, Angola, from 1945 to Recent Times. Ohio University Press. ISBN 978-0-8214-4304-0. (review in H-Luso-Africa)
- Catarina Madeira Santos (2008). "Luanda". In Liam Matthew Brockey (ed.). Portuguese Colonial Cities in the Early Modern World. Ashgate. ISBN 9780754663133.
- "Angola: The high cost of living in Luanda". Global Voices. 9 November 2009.

2010s

- P. Jenkins (2011), "Maputo and Luanda", in Simon Bekker and Goran Therborn (ed.), Capital Cities in Africa: Power and Powerlessness, Dakar: Council for the Development of Social Science Research in Africa, ISBN 978-2-8697-8495-6
- Sílvia Leiria Viegas (2012), Urbanization in Luanda – via International Planning History Society
- Arlindo Manuel Caldeira (2013), "Luanda in the 17th Century: Diversity and Cultural Interaction in the Process of Forming an Afro-Atlantic City", Nordic Journal of African Studies, 22
- Roquinaldo Ferreira (2013). "Slavery and the Social and Cultural Landscapes of Luanda". In Jorge Canizares-Esguerra; et al. (eds.). Black Urban Atlantic in the Age of the Slave Trade. University of Pennsylvania Press. ISBN 978-0-8122-0813-9.
- Carlos Nunes Silva, ed. (2015). Urban Planning in Lusophone African Countries. UK: Ashgate. ISBN 978-1472444882. (Includes articles about Luanda)
- Sílvia Leiria Viegas (2016). "Urbanisation and Peri-Urbanisation in Luanda: A Geopolitical and Socio-Spatial Perspective from the Late Colonial Period to the Present". Journal of Southern African Studies. 42 (4).
- Vanessa de Pacheco Melo (2016). "Production of Urban Peripheries For and By Low-Income Populations at the Turn of the Millennium: Maputo, Luanda and Johannesburg". Journal of Southern African Studies. 42 (4).
