= Ingombota =

Urban District of Luanda

- Administrative Division of Luanda
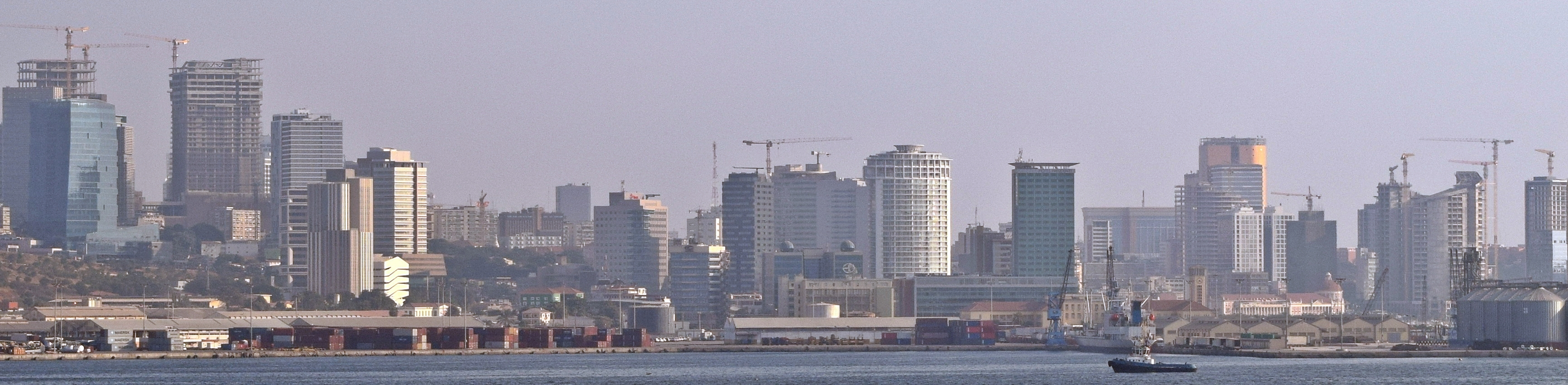
- Ingombota as seen from the Seafront
- Interactive map of Ingombota
- Coordinates: 8°49′05″S 13°13′44″E
- Country: Angola
- Province: Luanda
- Founded: 1576

Area
  - Total: 14.91 km^{2} (5.76 sq mi)
- Elevation: 6 m (20 ft)

Population (2024)
  - Total: 145,000
  - Density: 9,730/km^{2} (25,200/sq mi)
- Time zone: +1
- HDI (2019): 0.697; Medium

Ingombota is one of the six urban districts that make up the municipality of Luanda, in the province of Luanda, the capital city of Angola. Ingombota is home to the central business district of Luanda, Angola. The economic, political and symbolic center of the city and the nation, it is Luanda's oldest district. The district is home to most of Luanda's prominent hotels and office towers.

== Etymology ==
The name 'Ingombota' originates from Kimbundu, while two theories exist about its etymology. One theory argues that Ingombota comes from joining the words 'ingombo' and 'kuta', meaning place where there are abundant quiabos. The other theory too argues that the name was formed by joining the words Ngombo and kuta, but that it meant 'a refuge for outlaws' (possibly slaves), giving rise to the word 'Ngombota', or 'Ingombota' in Portuguese.

== Orientation ==
Ingombota has an area of 14.91 square kilometers (5.78 square miles) and an estimated population of 145,000 inhabitants. The district is bordered to the west by the Atlantic Ocean, Sambizanga to the north, Rangel to the east, and Maianga to the south. Ingombota is home to the Port of Luanda, the National Museum of Anthropology, the National Assembly, the Fortress of São Miguel, the Museu Nacional de História Natural de Angola, and the Museu da Moeda. The district has an estimated population density of 100,000 people per square mile. Redevelopment of the historic colonial core has entailed the demolition of informal and low-income housing options for residents in favor of higher-end commercial and residential structures. Prominent examples of this redevelopment and displacement is the demolition of the Cuca Building and Kinaxixe Market.

== Neighborhoods ==
The Ingombota District is made up of the seven neighborhoods of Luanda Island, Baixa, Cidade Alta, Ingombota, Maculusso, Kinanga, and Patrice Lumumba. These are older, urbanized neighborhoods which make up the historic and economic core of Luanda Province.

=== Luanda Island ===
The Luanda Island is a narrow strip of land located between Baía de Luanda and the Atlantic Ocean. Igreja da Nossa Senhora do Cabo, the oldest church in Angola, is located on Luanda Island.

=== Baixa ===
Baixa, the lower city, concentrates the financial and commercial activities in the capital. Headquarters of the largest companies operating in Angola, both domestic and foreign, are located here, mainly on and near the Avenida 4 de Fevereiro. Ingombota also has several hotels, numerous restaurants, clubs, bars, bakeries, kiosks and many shops, besides the ever-present peddlers market, the responsibility of zungueira.

=== Cidade Alta ===
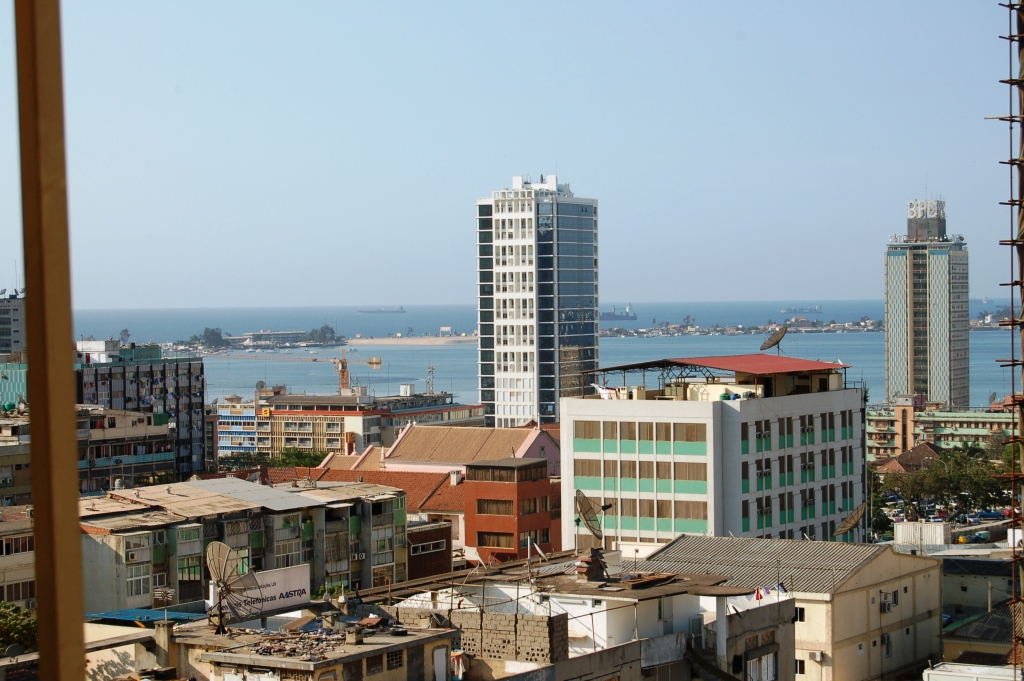
A view of Imgombota neighborhood

Cidade Alta, the upper town is home to the Presidential Palace, several ministries, the National Assembly near the Fortaleza de São Miguel and the Igreja de Jesus, where Paulo Dias de Novais, the founder of the City of Luanda, is buried. The area occupies a lofty position on the city and is a popular location for tourists and locals, with heavily guarded police all around, thanks to the proximity of the Presidential Palace.

=== Ingombota ===
Located in the Ingombota neighborhood are the Museum of the Armed Forces of Angola, the National Museum of Anthropology and the National Museum of Natural History of Angola. The majority of Luanda's Portuguese colonial era structures are located in this neighborhood. In recent years, many have been renovated and restored to their former beauty. A pedestrian corniche was constructed between 2008 and 2011 providing public access to Luanda Bay. The corniche is a popular place for gathering and recreation among locals.

=== Maculusso ===
Maculusso is a neighborhood located in the southern portion of Ingombota. The neighborhood developed under the period of Portuguese colonization in Angola. The neighborhood was originally built for a working-class population of merchants, missionaries, soldiers and others. The area continues to be a primarily residential quarter with a formally-planned street pattern. Streets in the quarter are paved often with sidewalks and trees. The area is now an upper-middle class district with abundant luxury houses, leisure areas, historic sites, and international hotels and restaurants.

The area consists primarily of low-rise homes with adjoining private gardens, but with the discovery of oil in Angola has seen the construction of a number of high-rise residential and hotel structures. The Holy Family Church (Igreja Sagrada Família) and the Mutu Ya Kevela School are two of the most prominent cultural landmarks in the neighborhood. Angola's Central Military Hospital and Maternity Hospital are located across the street from Holy Family Church. Dipanda Tower, the Tropical Cinema and Largo da Independence are other attractions in the area.

=== Kinanga ===
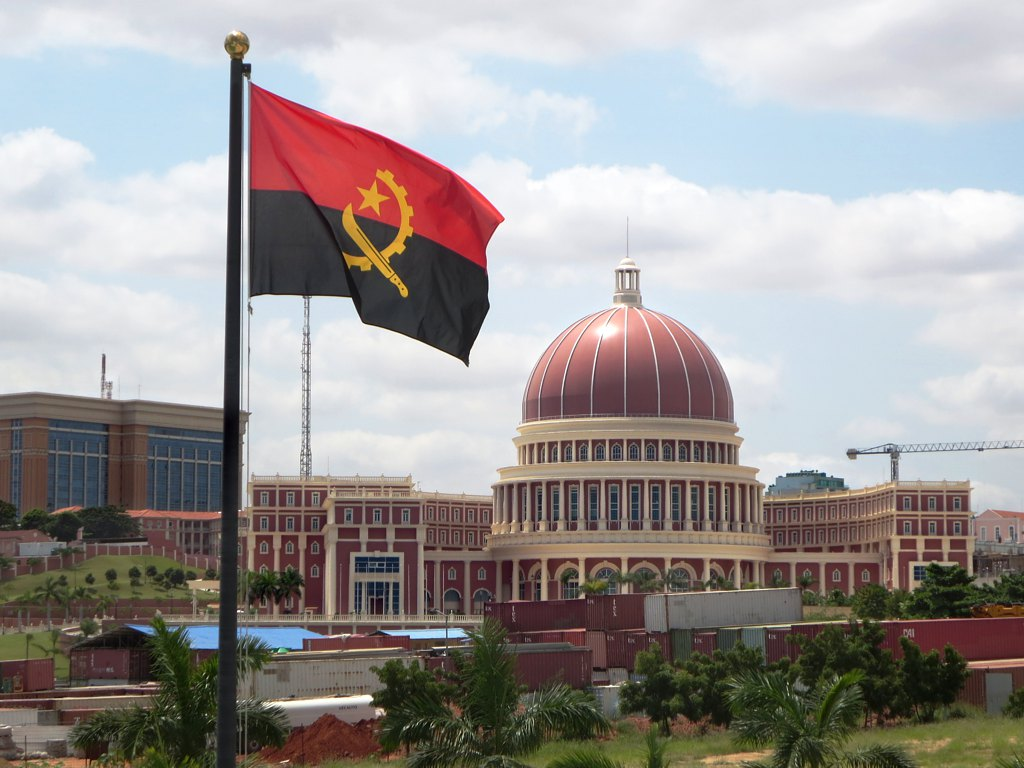
The National Assembly Building of Angola

Kinanga is a formerly working-class residential district located in the southwest section of Ingombota. Previously, the neighborhood consisted largely of informally built residential structures on a slope overlooking the Atlantic Ocean. In recent years many of these structures have been demolished and replaced by a parkway and the Agostinho Neto Memorial and park. The new National Assembly (Angola) campus overlooks the neighborhood.

=== Patrice Lumumba ===
Patrice Lumumba is a working-class residential district on the east side of Ingombota District. The neighborhood is set atop a hill overlooking Luanda Bay. A large public square dedicated to Patrice Lumumba is located at the intersection of Largo de Ambiente and R. Major Kanhangulo Avenue. Angola's Ministry of Interior is located in the neighborhood and is one of several new office buildings that were built in the neighborhood in the 2010s. Similar to other neighborhoods in Ingombota, in the 2010s many of the informal residential structures were cleared and replaced with higher-end office towers, hotels and apartment buildings.

== Transportation ==
Ingombota is home to Luanda's Central Train Station which provides service to the Luanda Railway. The Port of Luanda is located in the eastern portion Ingombota along the Luanda Bay. Quatro de Fevereiro Airport is located 6 kilometers to the south of the district, though the new Angola International Airport replaced the airport in 2026 and is located 40 kilometers to the southwest of Ingombota. Construction of the Luanda Light Rail began in Ingombota in 2020. The neighborhood consists primarily of paved streets which host motorbikes, bicycles, public buses and informal vans.
