= List of museums in Angola =

This is a list of museums in Angola.

== Museums in Angola ==
- Museu Nacional de Antropologia
- Museu Nacional de História Natural de Angola
- Dundo Museum
- Museu Central das Forças Armadas
- Museu Nacional da Escravatura

== See also ==
- List of museums
- List of libraries in Angola
