= Timeline of Benguela =

The following is a timeline of the history of the city of Benguela, Angola.

== Prior to 20th century ==
- 1617 - Forte de São Filipe de Benguela founded in Portuguese Angola, under colonial governor Manuel Cerveira Pereira.
- 1641 - Benguela taken by Dutch.
- 1648 - Dutch ousted; Portuguese in power again.
- 1779 - Antonio Jose Pimental de Castro e Mesquita appointed colonial governor of Benguela.
- 1784 - Pedro Jose Correia de Quevedo Homem e Magalhaes becomes governor.
- 1792 - Francisco Paim da Camara Ornellas becomes governor (approximate date).
- 1795 - Alexandre José Botelho de Vasconcelos appointed governor.
- 1803 - Francisco Infante de Sequeira Correa da Silva becomes governor (approximate date).
- 1810 - Jose Maria Doutel d'Almeida becomes governor (approximate date).
- 1814 - Joao de Alvellos Leiria becomes governor (approximate date).
- 1816 - Joze Joaquim Marques de Graca becomes governor (approximate date).
- 1817 - Manoel d'Abreu de Mello e Alvim becomes governor (approximate date).
- 1828 - Joaquim Aurelio de Oliveira becomes governor (approximate date).
- 1836 - Slave trade officially abolished.
- 1900 - Benguella province active.

== 20th century ==
- 1912
  - Caminho de Ferro de Benguela (railway) to Huambo begins operating (approximate date).
  - Jornal de Benguela newspaper begins publication.
- 1915 - Sporting Clube de Benguela formed.
- 1920 - Clube Nacional de Benguela (football club) formed.
- 1921 - Império Sport Clube formed
- 1940 - Population: 14,243.
- 1960 - Population: 23,256.
- 1963 - Sé Catedral de Nossa Senhora de Fátima (church) built.
- 1965 - Lomaum Dam built on the Catumbela River in vicinity of Benguela.
- 1970
  - Population: 40,996 (including 10,175 whites).
  - Roman Catholic Diocese of Benguela established.
- 1972 - Autódromo de Benguela opens.
- 1975 - Benguela becomes part of newly independent Republic of Angola.
- 1981 - Estrela Clube Primeiro de Maio (football club) formed.
- 1983 - Population: 155,000 (estimate).

== 21st century ==
- 2005 - Population: 151,235 (estimate).
- 2007
  - Pavilhão Acácias Rubras (arena) opens.
  - August: Part of AfroBasket 2007 played in Benguela.
- 2009
  - Estádio Nacional de Ombaka (stadium) and 4 de Abril Bridge (to Lobito) open.
  - Universidade Katyavala Bwila founded.
- 2010 - January: Part of 2010 Africa Cup of Nations football contest played in Benguela.
- 2011 - City joins the União das Cidades Capitais Luso-Afro-Américo-Asiáticas.
- 2012 - Catumbela Airport opens in vicinity of Benguela.
- 2018 - Population: 623,777 (estimate, urban agglomeration).

== See also ==
- Benguela history
- Reino de Benguela (1617–1869)
- Timeline of Luanda

== Bibliography ==
- Esteves Pereira; Guilherme Rodrigues, eds. (1906). "Benguella". Portugal: Diccionario Historico... (in Portuguese). Vol. 2. Lisbon: Joao Romano Torres. hdl:2027/gri.ark:/13960/t6m081q3b. OCLC 865826167.
- Mariana P. Candido (2013). An African Slaving Port and the Atlantic World: Benguela and Its Hinterland. Cambridge University Press. ISBN 978-1-107-01186-1.
