= Luanda Bay =

Bay in Luanda Province, Angola

- Baía de Luanda (Portuguese)
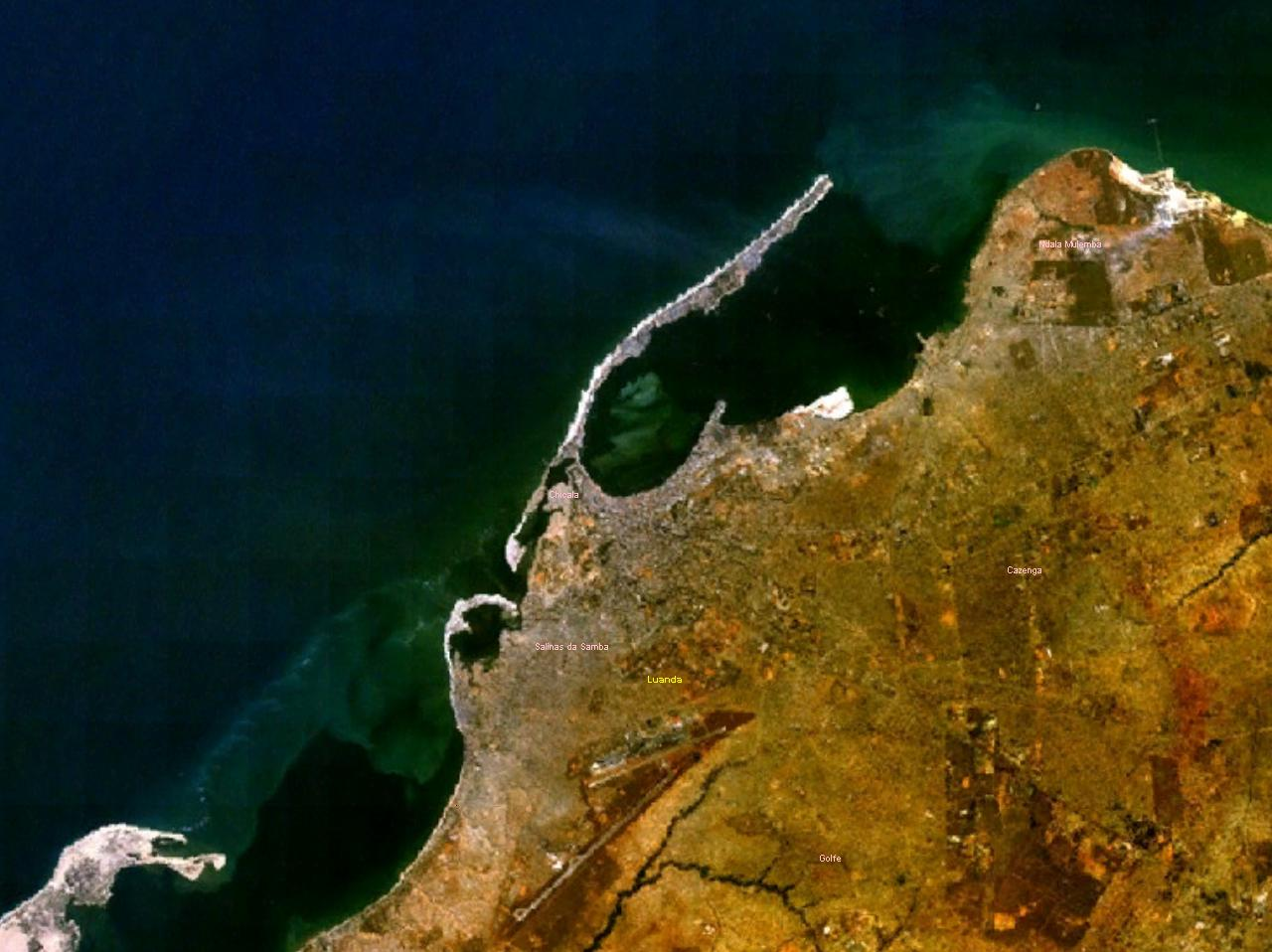
- Satellite image of Luanda with Luanda Bay visible in the center

- Location in Angola
- Coordinates: 8°46′57″S 13°15′40″E
- Ocean/sea sources: Atlantic Ocean
- Basin countries: Angola
- Settlements: Luanda

Luanda Bay is a body of water, located in front of the city of Luanda, capital of Angola. In front of the bay are located several monuments of great historical value, such as the Banco de Angola Building and the Church of Nossa Senhora da Nazaré.

The bay, whose waters are protected by the island of Luanda, was the place of foundation of the city of Luanda by Paulo Dias de Novais in 1575/1576. On the banks of the bay, the so-called Cidade Baixa de Luanda grew, where most of the city's population settled, while Cidade Alta de Luanda was formed as an administrative and military center.

Luanda Bay was an immense bay that extended from cape of the Lagostas (Cacuaco Cove) to Corimba cape, close to the Vala do Samba River, isolated in the Atlantic Ocean by another major geographical accident, the island of Luanda. This geographical configuration lasted until the first half of the 20th century, when the natural channel that formed the great bay of Luanda was earthworks for the construction of a passage on Avenida 4 de Fevereiro (English: 4 February Avenue). Thus, an avenue separated the northern portion from the southern portion of the Luanda bay, forming a new geographical accident, which received the name of Samba bay, but with characteristics similar to an estuary. The southern part of the island of Luanda became the Chicala cape, a new peninsula.

== See also ==
- Geography of Angola
- Port of Luanda
