= Igreja de Jesus (Luanda) =

Church in Luanda, Angola

The Igreja de Jesus, also Igreja dos Jesuítas, is a landmark in the Ingombota District of Luanda, Angola, adjacent to the Presidential Palace in the cidade alta neighborhood. It is the former church of the Jesuit college established in the city in the early 17th century. It has a fine baroque façade and a richly decorated interior.

== History ==
In the 1580s, Portuguese governor Paulo Dias de Novais donated the land on which the church stands to the Society of Jesus, on a site then known as Praça da Feira (Market Square). The church's construction started in 1607 or 1612 and lasted until 1636.

From 1641 to 1648, Luanda was occupied by the Dutch Republic and the church was used as an assembly hall while the nearby Jesuit college hosted the governor's residence. Luanda was retaken by Portuguese administrator Salvador de Sá in 1648 and the Jesuits recovered their properties. Following Portugal's suppression of the Society of Jesus in 1759, the church rapidly fell into disrepair. It was restored from 1953 and reopened in December 1958, on designs by architect Humberto Reis. It underwent further modification in the early 1970s.

== See also ==
- Church of Our Lady of Remedies
- Igreja da Nossa Senhora do Cabo
- Igreja de Nossa Senhora da Conceição (Luanda)
- Nossa Senhora da Nazaré
- List of Jesuit sites
