= Luanda Light Rail =

Proposed light rail line to be built in Luanda, Angola

Overview
- Locale: Luanda, Angola
- Transit type: Light rail

Technical
- System length: 149 km (93 mi)

The Luanda Light Rail is a proposed light rail line to be built in the Angolan capital city Luanda.

== History ==
In 2020, the proposal for a light rail network in Luanda was announced, with construction proposed to begin that same year. German transport company Siemens Mobility signed a memorandum of understanding with the Angolan government in early 2020 to begin building the 149 km (93 mi) network under a public private partnership.

The network was proposed to serve the main axis of the city; from the Port of Luanda to Cacuaco, Avenida Fidel Castro Ruz-Benfica, Port of Luanda - Largo da Independência and Cidade do Kilamba - 1º de Maio.

The initial 37 km (23.0 mi), named the Yellow Line, was proposed to link Port of Luanda with Kilamba via Quatro de Fevereiro Airport, Unidade Operativo de Luanda and Sapú.

After many changes and delays, the current project, consisting of a 60 km (37.3 mi) network is supposed to start construction in 2025.
