= Port of Luanda =

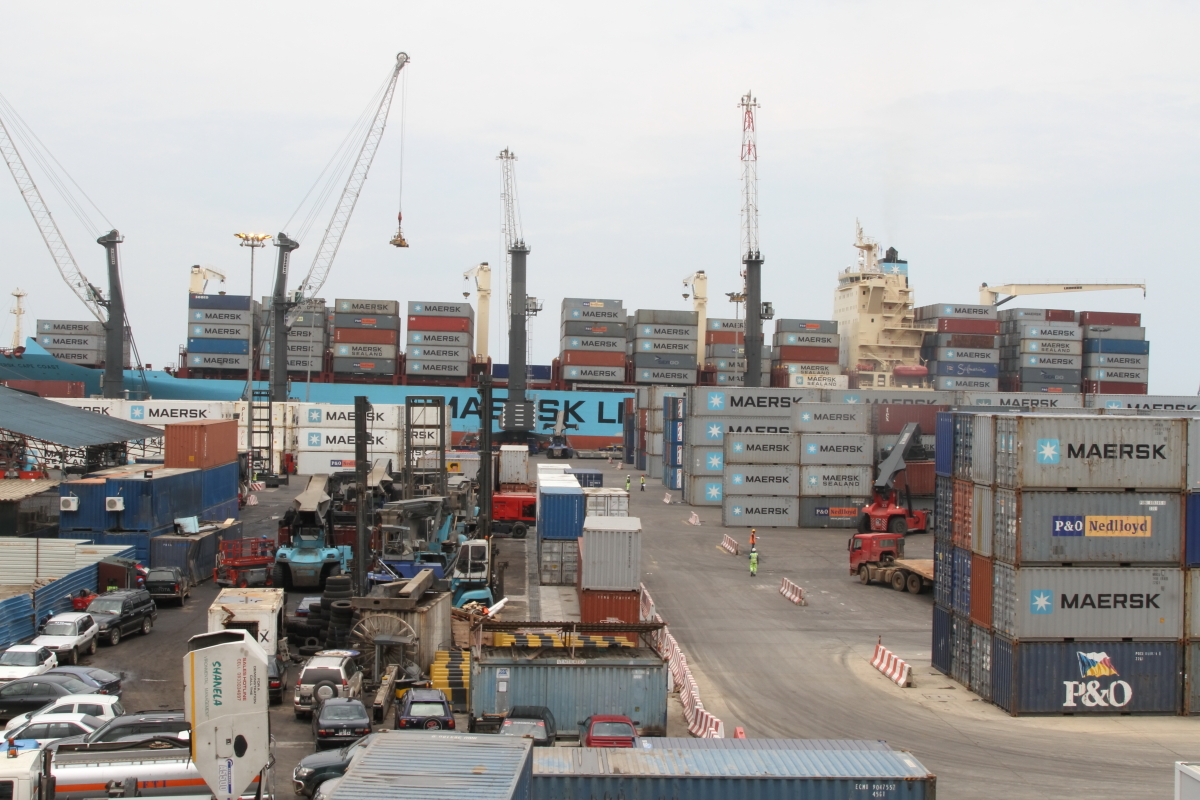
- Interactive map of Port of Luanda

Location
- Country: Angola
- Location: Luanda
- Coordinates: 08°48′S 13°14′E
- UN/LOCODE: AOLAD

Details
- Opened: 25 January 1576; 450 years ago
- Operated by: Porto de Luanda E.P.
- Type of Harbor: Artificial

Statistics
- Annual container volume: 625,000 (2023)
- Website www.portoluanda.co.ao

The port of Luanda (Portuguese: Porto do Luanda) is an Angolan port located in the city of Luanda, the national capital, in the province of Luanda. It is connected to the city center of Luanda and the district of Ingombota. Right on the Luanda Bay, which is separated from the Atlantic Ocean by the island of Luanda.

The port belongs to the Angolan government, which is responsible for its administration through the public company Porto de Luanda E.P. This company was established to administer the license for terminals for loading and unloading, in addition to the passenger terminal. Port of Luanda is a member of the International Association of Ports and Harbors (IAPH).

Together with the ports of Lobito (Benguela), Moçamedes (Namibe), Soyo (Zaire) and Cabinda (Cabinda), it forms the largest port complexes in the country. It is the largest port in the country, in addition to being the main import and export terminal for long-haul cargo in the nation. In 2023 the Port of Luanda handled more than 625,000 twenty-foot equivalent units (TEU) of containerised cargo, making it Angola's principal and busiest seaport and the main gateway for the country's imports, which range from iron and steel to machinery and foodstuffs.

Like many ports across Africa, the Port of Luanda requires a pre-shipment certificate or waiver for incoming cargo. Specifically, shipments must include a valid ARC number (Attestation de Réservation de Cargaison), also known as CNCA (Conselho Nacional de Carregadores), which must be recorded on the bill of lading.

The port is the outlet point of the Luanda railway, which carries cargo from the city of Malanje in the Malanje Province. Another important outflow connection is made via the EN-100 highway.
