= Dundo Museum =

Museum in Angola

- Museu do Dundo
- Former names: Dundo Ethnographic Museum
- Established: 1936
- Location: Dundo, Lunda Norte Province, Angola
- Coordinates: 7°22′43.8″S 20°50′05.2″E
- Type: Ethnographic, natural history
- Founder: Diamang

The Dundo Museum (Portuguese: Museu do Dondo), officially the Dundo Regional Museum and formerly called the Dungo Ethnographic Museum, is a national ethnographic and natural history museum in Dundo, Lunda Norte Province, Angola. It was founded in 1936 by the Diamang company, making it the country's first museum. It is considered one of the country's most important museums and one of the most important cultural museums in Africa. It focuses primarily on preserving artifacts related to the heritage and culture of eastern Angolan groups, particularly the Chokwe people, and also has natural history and archaeological collections. Several objects were looted during the Angolan Civil War and repatriation efforts are ongoing. On 18 April 2016, it was named a regional cultural reference monument.

== Exhibits ==
Most of the museum's collection focuses on the culture and history of East Angolans, particularly the Chokwe people. As of 2021, the Dundo Museum hosts approximately 10,200 ethnographic objects and 30,000 natural history specimens, including a herbarium.

The museum's entrance is fronted by two lion sculptures, which in Chokwe culture are symbols of protection; and a map of Angola is in the center. The main gallery in the museum contains a reconstructed Chokwe village. The museum is divided into different sections on daily life and political and social structure. Other exhibits inside the museum include a portrait gallery of Angolan chiefs; an "Indigenous Room" containing objects of cultural heritage; and an "Africa Room" containing objects repatriated from Europe beginning in the 1940s. The library houses about 25,000 books.

== History ==
=== Establishment and early years ===
The Diamang company established the headquarters for its diamond mining operations at Dundo in 1917. The town, consisting mostly of workers and their families, quickly grew, and most of the town's infrastructure was built and operated by Diamang. Soon, Diamang identified a need to document the local communities within their mining territory and formally established this in their mission. The Dundo Museum was established in 1936, initially to host the private collection of José Redinha, who had collected cultural objects from eastern Angola, as well as painted portraits of the local people in their traditional costume. In 1942, Redinha became first curator of the museum, which was then known as the Dundo Ethnographic Museum. His collection was initially placed in a room at Diamang's headquarters before a dedicated building was built, with construction beginning in 1942 and completing in 1947. A new village was soon established around the museum, with its own chief, who would welcome guests and provide tours.

In 1936, the Dundo Museum had 436 objects; by the end of 1937, the collection had increased to 2,296. The following year, Redinha collected an additional 700 objects from the Sombo area. By the 1950s, the Dundo Museum had collected over 7,000 objects. Some of these—particularly artwork and photographs—were exhibited overseas in Brazil and Europe. Besides cultural objects, the museum also curated archaeological artifacts and specimens of local plants. When the museum's natural history collection began in 1945, the name was shortened to the Dundo Museum. The museum also organized public festivals and dance competitions, at which native Angolans were asked to perform their traditional music, dances, and other ceremonies. The museum would record the ceremonies and folklore, supply traditional clothing, and provide winners of the competitions with prizes.

The Dundo Museum quickly became one of the most prominent research institutions in sub-Saharan Africa and supported studies in ethnography, biology, archaeology, geology, and related studies. It also funded missions in Angola to record folklore and traditions, with a focus on villages which had very little contact with Europeans. By 1957, more than 260 researchers from around the world were working in collaboration with the Dundo Museum; some of the most prominent, included Jean Janmart, head of Diamang's Prospecting Brigade; Henri Breuil; John Desmond Clark; and Louis Leakey. The museum also established the Publicações Culturais, a publication which documented research results from academics associated with Diamang and the museum. These and other documents were stored in the museum's library, which in 1955 counted 900 volumes of assorted material.

=== Angolan independence and 21st century ===
The museum did not halt acquisitions after the outbreak of the Angolan War of Independence in 1961. At the outbreak of the Angolan Civil War in 1975, the museum temporarily closed but reopened again on 11 November 1976. Several artifacts were looted, especially from the ethnography collection. Just before the civil war, the museum estimated about 20,000 objects in its collection. Documents detailing the museum's history were also lost. Artifacts continue to be found and returned to the museum. In 2015, the Sindika Dokolo Foundation announced its plan to recover more than 100 artworks that had gone missing during the civil war.

Between 1980 and 1994, the Dundo Museum was Angola's most visited museum, averaging about 25,000 people per year. In 2005, the museum closed for extensive renovations as part of a push by the Angolan government to revitalize the country's cultural heritage centers. During its closure, the building itself was renovated and refurnished and a multimedia room was added. The museum reopened to the public on August 12, 2012. The museum was named a regional cultural reference monument on 18 April 2016.

By the early 2020s, the museum had about 200–300 visitors per day. Protective measures were instated during the COVID-19 pandemic that restricted the number of visitors at any given time to 10. The Minister of Culture, Tourism and Environment, Jomo Fortunato, announced in August 2021 that a virtual museum would be created to allow online exploration of its collections.

== Relationship with native Angolans ==
Collaboration with locals was the main source by which the museum acquired artifacts. Over the years, other Diamang employees donated their own collections. The majority of objects were fielded from locals in collection campaigns, including from local chiefs of villages who supplied workers, with whom Diamang attempted to foster close relationships. The participation of the chiefs in this exchange may have been tied to cultural expectations of reciprocity and the securing of alliances with Diamang as a monopolistic colonial power. A 1955 report claimed the local people saw the Dundo Museum as their "tribal mansion".

Historically, the relationship between the museum and the local people was often strained. A 1946 report from the Tchiboco Ethnographic Campaign documented tensions between the expedition and locals. Disagreements arose about the type of objects the museum desired, the method in which they would be used or displayed, and generally about the acquisition of important objects. Additionally, Diamang would often require, coerce, or threaten new workers—some of whom had important ceremonial roles in their home villages—to donate cultural objects they had brought with them to Dundo. A chief's portrait could be removed from the gallery if Diamang was unsatisfied with the amount of workers his village supplied.

The museum stated its intent to preserve cultural heritage at risk of going extinct. During the 1940s, the Dundo Museum established an art gallery for portraits of local chiefs who visited the museum. In the late 1950s and 1960s, and especially after neighbouring Belgian Congo gained independence and competing interests from other museums emerged, Diamang enacted even more ambitious collections projects. Around this time, the museum established an "Africa Room", which fielded collections from Europe that had originated in Africa with the purpose of returning them to the continent. In 1960, 871 objects were counted in this room.

== See also ==
- Archaeology of Angola
- List of museums in Angola
