= Leba Cave =

Archaeological site in Angola

- Gruta da Leba (Portuguese)
- Location within Angola
- Interactive map of Leba Cave
- 15.083453°S 13.259457°E
- Type: cave
- Periods: Acheulean, Middle Stone Age, Late Stone Age
- Location: Huíla Province, Angola

Site notes
- Elevation: 1,757 m (5,764 ft)
- Length: 50 metres (160 ft)
- Width: 6 metres (20 ft)
- Excavation dates: 1950, 1974, 2018, 2019
- Discovered: 1947

Leba Cave (Portuguese: Gruta da Leba) is a dolomite cave and archaeological site on the Humpata Plateau in western Huíla Province, Angola. Excavated intermittently since 1950, the site is best known for its assemblages of Middle Stone Age stone tools.

== Description ==
Leba Cave is located in eastern Huíla Province, Angola, about 25 kilometres (16 mi) west of Lubango. It is situated at an altitude of 1,757 metres (5,764 ft) atop the western edge of the Humpata Plateau. The entrance is situated on the southern side of the Leba River. Leba Cave itself is named for the nearby village of Leba; this name comes from the local Nyanheka dialect word eleva, meaning "hole in the rock" or "crevice".

The cave has a maximum width of 6 metres (20 ft) and extends to a known depth of 50 metres (160 ft). It is tube-shaped with a narrowing at the middle. Passage beyond the deepest part, which is 3 metres (9.8 ft) lower than the entrance, is blocked by debris.

Ripple marks and tufa deposits around the cave's entrance indicate that it may have been carved out by a waterfall and then inhabited once the water receded. The cave is geologically part of the Leba-Tchamalindi Formation, a primarily dolomite formation with inclusions of siltites, cherts, as well as fossil stromatolites. Mineral deposits inside the cave date from the Miocene to the Early Holocene. The cave's bedrock is highly fractured and fissured.

== History ==
Leba Cave was officially discovered as an archaeological site in 1947 during the construction of nearby lime kilns for the Fazenda da Leba factory. However, archaeologist Raymond Dart reported in 1950 that Portuguese colleagues had been studying fossiliferous breccia deposits which had been removed from the cave several years earlier. It was first excavated in 1950 by José Camarate-França, during the Anthropobiological Mission of Angola. Camarate-França may have returned to the site to excavate more material in 1951 and 1953. In 1966, John Desmond Clark published a description of 28 Middle Stone Age (MSA) lithic tools found at Leba Cave. A smaller excavation led by Victor Oliveira Jorge was undertaken in 1974, and then work at the site was stalled by the Angolan Civil War. Early fieldwork notes are lacking; Camarate-França produced only a four-page report, although at the time of his death in 1963 he had been working on a larger paper intended for publication. Detailed records of Oliveira Jorge's excavations have been lost. New excavations began at the site under the direction of Daniela de Matos in February 2018.

== Archaeology ==
Stone tools are a common find inside Leba Cave, primarily dating to the Middle and Late Stone Ages with some earlier and later finds dating to the Acheulean and Iron Age. Lithics are most commonly crafted from chert or quartz, which are both plentiful inside and around the cave, including as fluvial deposits from the nearby Leba River. Many of the stone tools are worked points and blades; others are unfinished blanks or discarded bits. The site may have been only periodically inhabited, used by early humans as a "refuge" while traversing between the arid coastal regions and the forests of the Humpata Plateau.

A diverse array of animal remains have also been recovered at the site. Many of these are common game animals—zebras, antelope, a rhinoceros, a warthog, and buffalo. Also present are the remains of baboons and various birds. The remains of a domestic dog dating to the colonial period have also been recovered. This range of animals is comparable to remains found elsewhere in central and southwestern Africa. A few of these bones show signs of having been worked by humans or fire exposure. Paleontologist Eli Minkoff hypothesized that trauma observed on a baboon skull may have been caused by an australopithecine. At certain points, the cave was solely occupied by carnivorous animals such as lions, leopards, and hyenas, as some of the remains display signs of predation.

== See also ==
- Archaeology of Angola
