= List of libraries in Angola =

This is a list of libraries in Angola.

== Libraries ==
- National Library of Angola (84,000 volumes)
- Agostinho Neto University Library (75,000 volumes)
- Luanda Municipal Library (30,000 volumes)
- Geological and Mining Services Directorate Library (40,000 volumes)
- National Historical Center Library (12,000 volumes)

== See also ==
- List of museums in Angola
