= Archaeology of Angola =

Archaeological explorations in Angola have been carried out since the late 19th century. Much of the early research was funded and led by Portuguese colonial interests in Angola, fueled by the Scramble for Africa. The 1890 British Ultimatum on the expansion of the Portuguese Empire led to the latter's further emphasis on colonial development in central Africa, including Angola, and the exploration of its cultural resources to strengthen its colonial system. In the 20th century, archaeology in Angola focused largely on the Stone Age, driven by colonial interests in evolutionary anthropology, until Angolan independence in 1975. During that time, several research institutions and museums were opened, and fieldwork was largely tied to mission trips into the country to document the cultures of native Angolans. In recent decades, partnerships have formed between Angolan archaeologists and those from France and Portugal to continue research. Calls to repatriate artifacts back to Angola from overseas collections have also gained momentum in recent decades.

== History of archaeology ==
=== 19th century ===
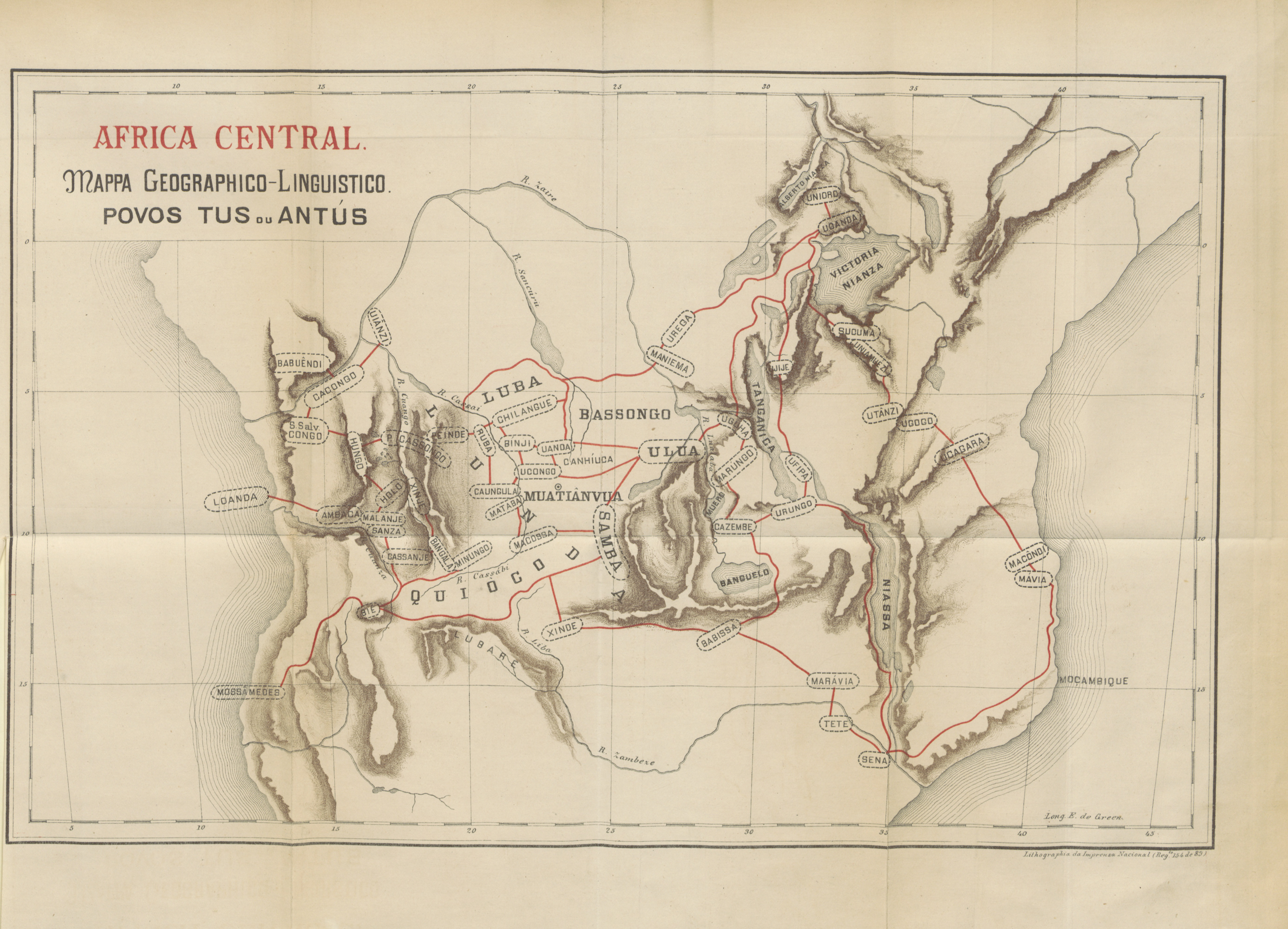
Early ethnographic and linguistic map of central Africa, 1890

During the 19th century, Europeans exploring Africa began recording the presence of archaeological sites along their routes. The earliest such record was made by James Hingston Tuckey during his 1816 excavation along the River Congo. Tuckey recorded the presence of a rock shelter with petroglyphs at Pedra de Feitiço.

The earliest organized archaeological explorations of Angola were spearheaded by colonial interests—particularly of the Portuguese, who had begun colonizing Angola in 1575—as the Scramble for Africa began. New governmental agencies, such as the Lisbon Geographic Society in 1875 and the Commissão de Cartographia in 1883, were formed to explore and map the interior regions of Angola and the rest of the Portuguese Empire by sending missions into previously-unexplored areas. Explorers Hermenegildo Capelo and Roberto Ivens led expeditions in Angola in 1877 and again in 1884–1885, and their findings were some of the earliest compiled on central African archaeology and ethnography. Ricardo Servero also collected artifacts during his ethnological visits to the region. His report on a few stone tools given to him by an acquaintance became the first published material on Angolan archaeological artifacts in 1890.

Following the 1890 British Ultimatum, Portuguese interests turned to establishing its colonial foothold in its already-occupied territories, including Angola.

Collection of Portuguese coins found in Angola

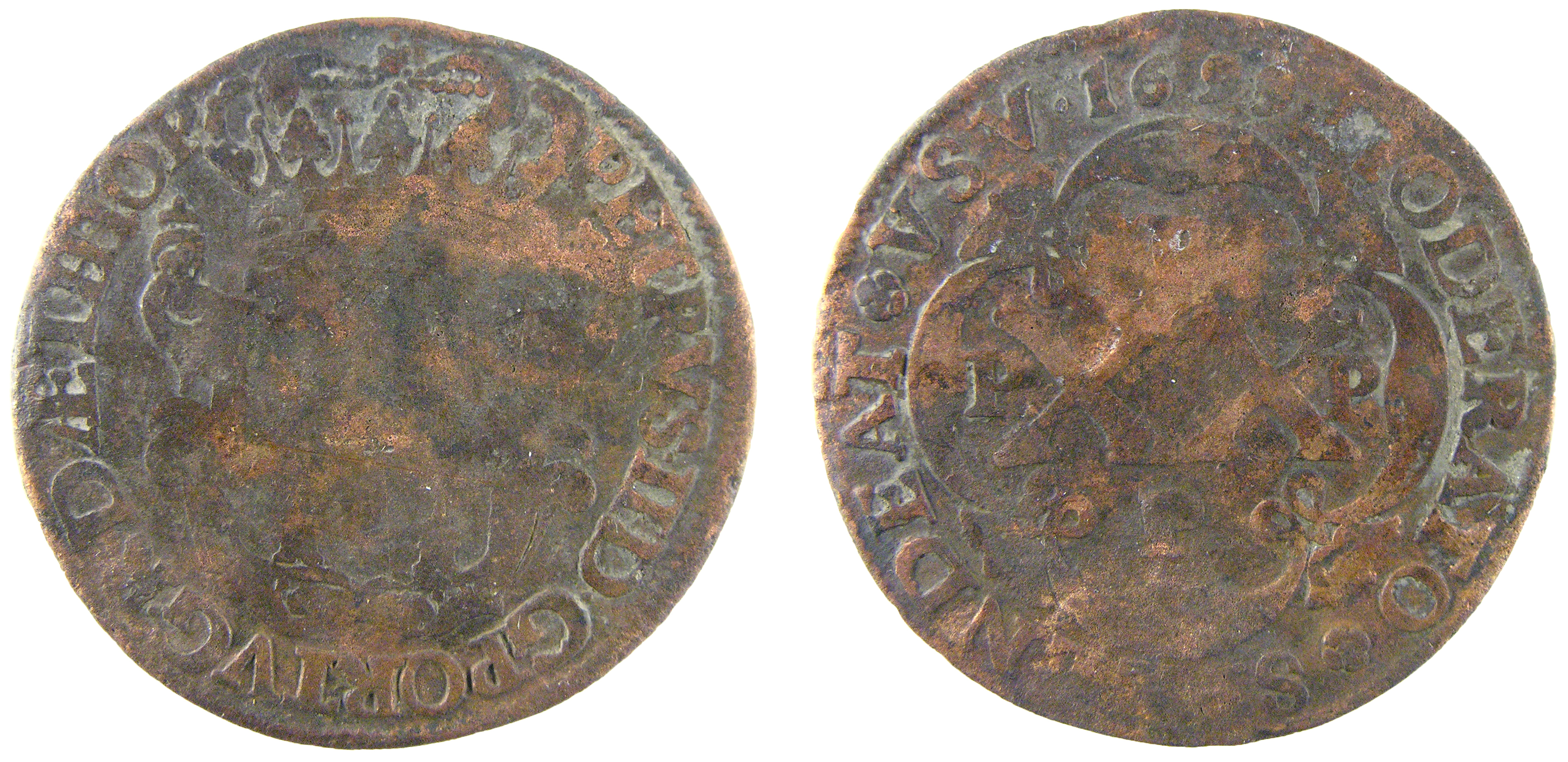
20 reis coin of Pedro II of Portugal, 1699

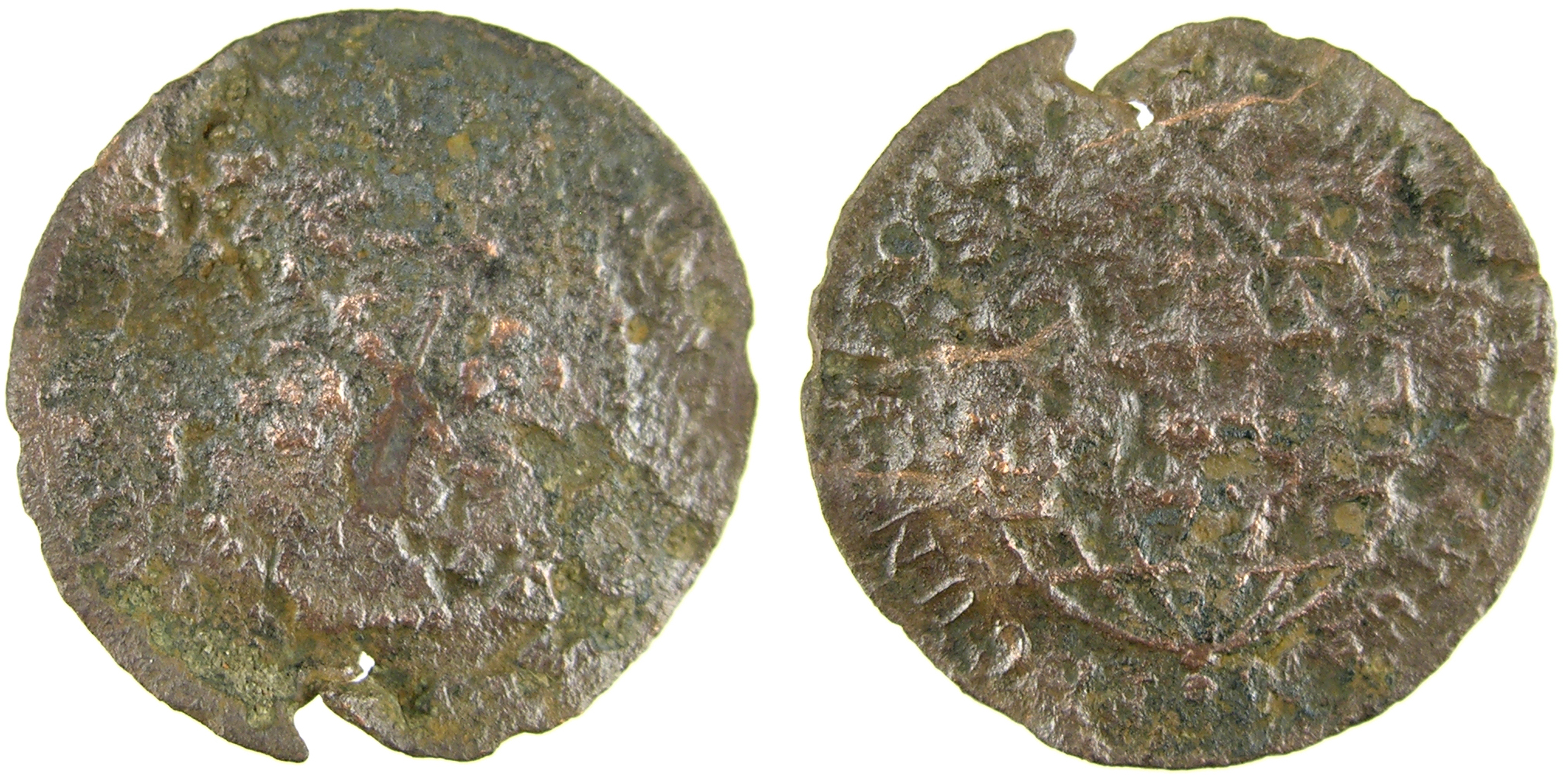
10 reis coin, c. 1719–1757

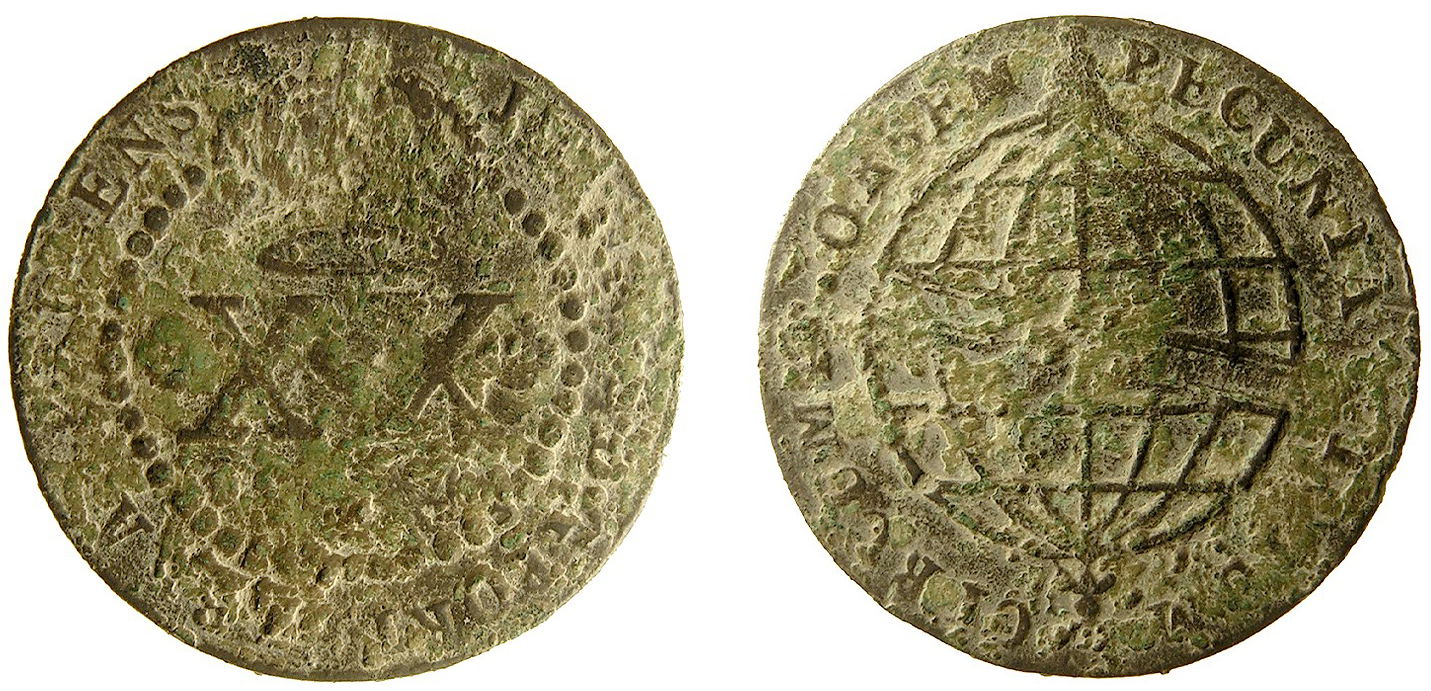
20 reis con of John V of Portugal, 1749

=== 1890–1974 ===
As the 20th century progressed, Portuguese interests in the ethnographic history of central Africa grew. During this period, political interest in more effectively governing Angola joined with academic interests in the ethnology of its native peoples. Particular attention was paid to Angola, as its landscape yielded abundant natural resources that supported a profitable mining industry. During the excavations of these mines, hundreds of archaeological sites were uncovered. The Companhia de Diamantes de Angola (Diamang) had control of over 30,000 square kilometres (12,000 sq mi) in northeast Angola and subsequently funded archaeological research in its territory, later expanding to found museums and other research institutions. The building of railroads also caused the discovery of more artifacts, the first of which were found by Fernando Mouta, headchief of the Serviço de Geologia e Minas de Angola (SGMA). Mouta published the first map of lithic assemblages in Angola in 1934.

José Leite de Vasconcelos, the director of the National Museum of Archaeology, Lisbon, Portugal, published another article that included prehistoric Angolan stone tools in 1913. The 1934 Congresso Nacional de Antropologia Colonial do Porto published by explorer Joaquim Santos Júnior documented his findings while on expedition with Alexandre de Serpa Pinto.

The establishment of the Estado Novo brought with it an increased push to justify Portuguese colonial rule. Several new institutions, such as the Portuguese Academy of History, were established with this goal in mind; and others were restructured, as was the Commissão de Cartographia absorbed into the National Board for Geographical Missions and Colonial Research. Diamang established a cultural heritage museum in 1942 at its headquarters in Dundo to house the many artifacts its operations had by then uncovered, as well as hosting modern pieces of heritage donated from the local area. The Dundo Museum supported further research endeavours in Angola and became one of the most prominent research institutions in sub-Saharan Africa. Several archaeologists, including Henri Breuil, John Desmond Clark, and Louis Leakey were drawn to the area to explore the Congo Basin's Stone Age history. Clark published The Distribution of Prehistoric Culture in Angola in 1966, one of the most important works for Angolan Stone Age research.

In the 1940s, efforts to understand the palaeontology and archaeology of sub-Saharan Africa began being consolidated. The 1947 Pan-African Congress on Prehistory, the first such annual convention, was attended by Mouta and other local archaeologists representing Angola's presence. This spurred increased attention on Angola's archaeological potential. New museums and collections opened in Angola, including the Sá da Bandeira Mission and the Regional Museum of Huíla. A bulletin, the Junta de Investigação do Ultramar, was founded in 1950 and published all material on Angolan anthropology and archaeology. In 1959, the Scientific Research Institute of Angola (IICA) was founded to oversee all archaeological research efforts in Angola.

However, contemporary studies followed a school of thought, solidified by Portuguese anthropologist António Mendes Correia, favouring physical anthropology over archaeology, as native populations were to be evaluated for work purposes. Thus, only about 25% of fieldwork on mission trips was dedicated to archaeology, the rest reserved for studying the physical attributes of Angolans. Additionally, what archaeology was performed heavily focused on the Stone Age and evolutionary implications for Angola. Bruno Pastre Máximo wrote in 2020, "The major objective of these “scientific” incursions was to provide the Salazar with arguments which would justify the maintenance of the status quo and the empire, based essentially on the decadent concept of “inferior races” and on the contrast between “barbarian and civilized.”

The Anthrobiological Mission of Angola, led by António de Almeida, took place between 1948 and 1955 with the intention of documenting the ethnology, languages, and history of Angola. Most of its archaeological excavations relied on maps that had been produced by the SGMA. Thousands of artifacts were excavated and taken back to Portugal. In 1950, José Camarate França joined the mission and became one of the leading archaeologists in Angola until his death in 1963.

Archaeological excavations in Angola stalled until 1966, following the death of Camarate França and the busy schedules of other academics. Miguel Fonseca Ramos, initially a student of geology, was chosen to lead new excavations in 1966 as part of the Mission of Archaeological Studies in Southwest Angola (MEASA). By the time the mission concluded in 1967, 103,000 artifacts had been excavated and 11 new sites identified. Under the direction of the IICA, the University of Luanda's School of Arts and Humanities began teaching anthropology and archaeology classes in 1970, led by Joaquim Santos Júnior. Most of the faculty were from institutions in Portugal. The development of this department began to distance Angolan anthropology from its colonial purpose, as academics began taking a more scientific and critical approach to research.

=== 1975–2002 ===
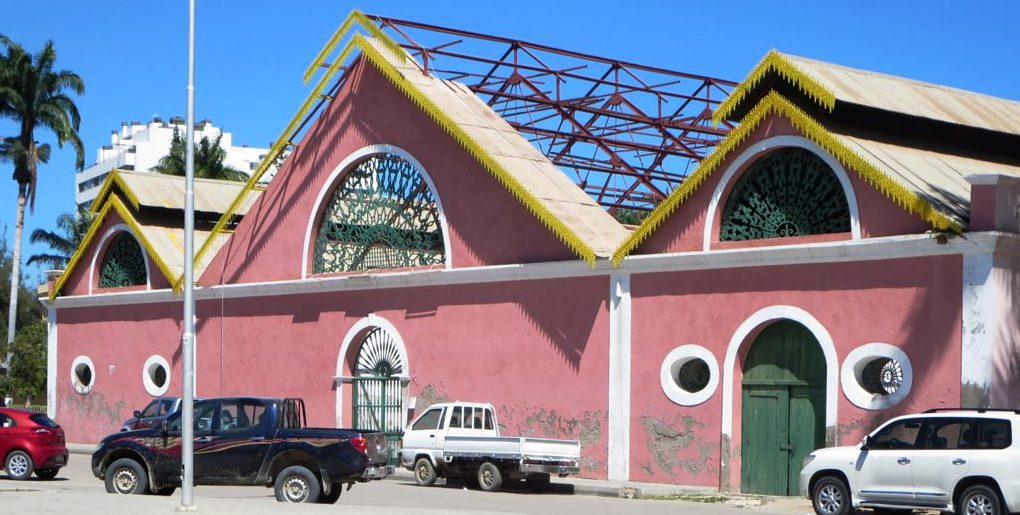
National Archaeological Museum in Benguela

The 1974 Carnation Revolution brought an end to Portuguese colonial rule in Angola, halting any ongoing archaeological research by the Portuguese academics as many fled the country. While many institutions and museums were closed, others were integrated into the new government. Ramos created the Center of Prehistory and Archaeology during this restructure in 1983. The National Laboratory of Anthropology continued operations from Soyo, and the National Archaeological Museum opened in 1979 in Benguela. The museum's curator, L. Pais Pinto, led new excavations at previously-explored sites in the 1980s. As part of Martin Pickford and Brigitte Senut's larger Southern African archaeological project, further excavations were carried out by the Angola Paleontology Expedition in 1989 in partnership with the Collège de France.

=== 2002–present ===
The end of the Angolan Civil War allowed increased collaboration with international archaeologists and organizations, especially those from France and Portugal. New academic programs were introduced. Much of the new research is being done on rock art in the Ebo Valley. As part of a project by the Polytechnic Institute of Tomar and the Geosciences Center of Coimbra University to document rock art in Angola, 14 new rock shelters were discovered in 2014.

== Repatriation ==
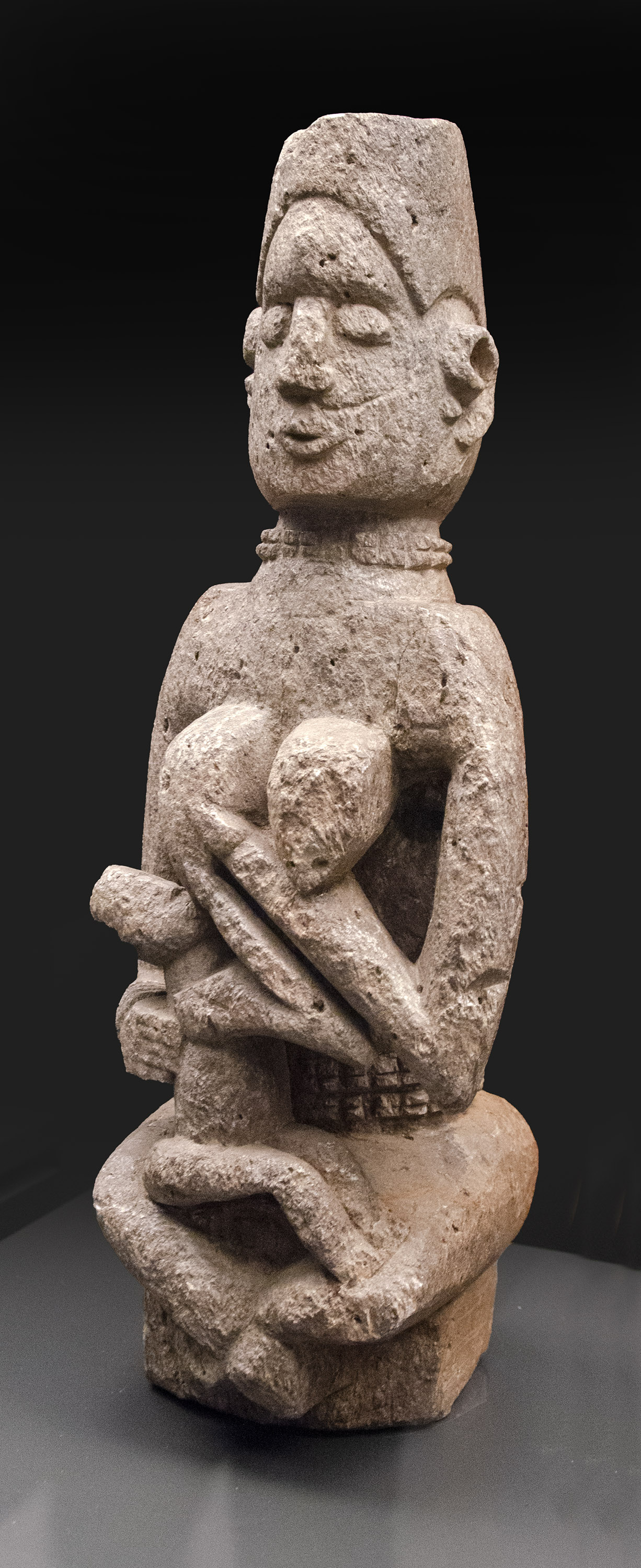
Figurine from the Bakongo culture in the British Museum

Efforts to repatriate archaeological artifacts and human remains back to Angola from international institutions have gained traction in recent years. During colonial rule, Angolan cultural heritage objects and human remains were removed from the country and placed in museums, institutions, and private collections. Thousands of archaeological artifacts were taken back to Portugal by Portuguese archaeologists for further study and display in museums. In the 1920s, Amandus Johnson travelled across Angola and collected artifacts for the Penn Museum at the University of Pennsylvania, United States.

Sindika Dokolo began purchasing artwork from the private collections of Hans Bogatzke. He then established the Sindika Dokolo Foundation, which had accrued over 5,000 pieces of artwork in by 2018. The foundation aims to repatriate works of art and artifacts back to the Chokwe people in Angola, many of which were looted from museums during the civil war.

== Sites ==
John Desmond Clark divided Angola's Stone Age sites into three geographic regions, which all meet at a central point near Huambo: the Southwest, containing the highlands and plateaus, as well as most of the Angola's Atlantic Coast; the Congo in the north, from the Congo Basin south to the Cuanza River; and Zambezi in the southeast, comprising the Zambezi, Cuando, and Cubango River watershed regions. During the early years of mining operations, the northeastern corner of the Congo region was well-explored by Diamang-associated archaeologists.

However, the Southwest region has yielded the most known archaeological sites and is the area where research, particularly of the Stone Age, has been most concentrated. The Humpata Plateau alone has yielded multiple sites in its many caverns and rifts. Sites such as Leba Cave have yielded stone tools from the entirety of the Stone Age, as well as faunal remains and hominin fossils. The coastal area itself contains multiple sites dating back to the Miocene and Pleistocene and has yielded evidence that Acheuleans may have been scavenging beached whales up to 600,000 years Before Present (BP).

There is a distinct lack of Iron Age and post-European contact archaeology in Angola, as interest was historically concentrated on older sites. Angola's first UNESCO World Heritage Site, M'banza-Kongo, was recognized in 2017.

=== Notable sites ===
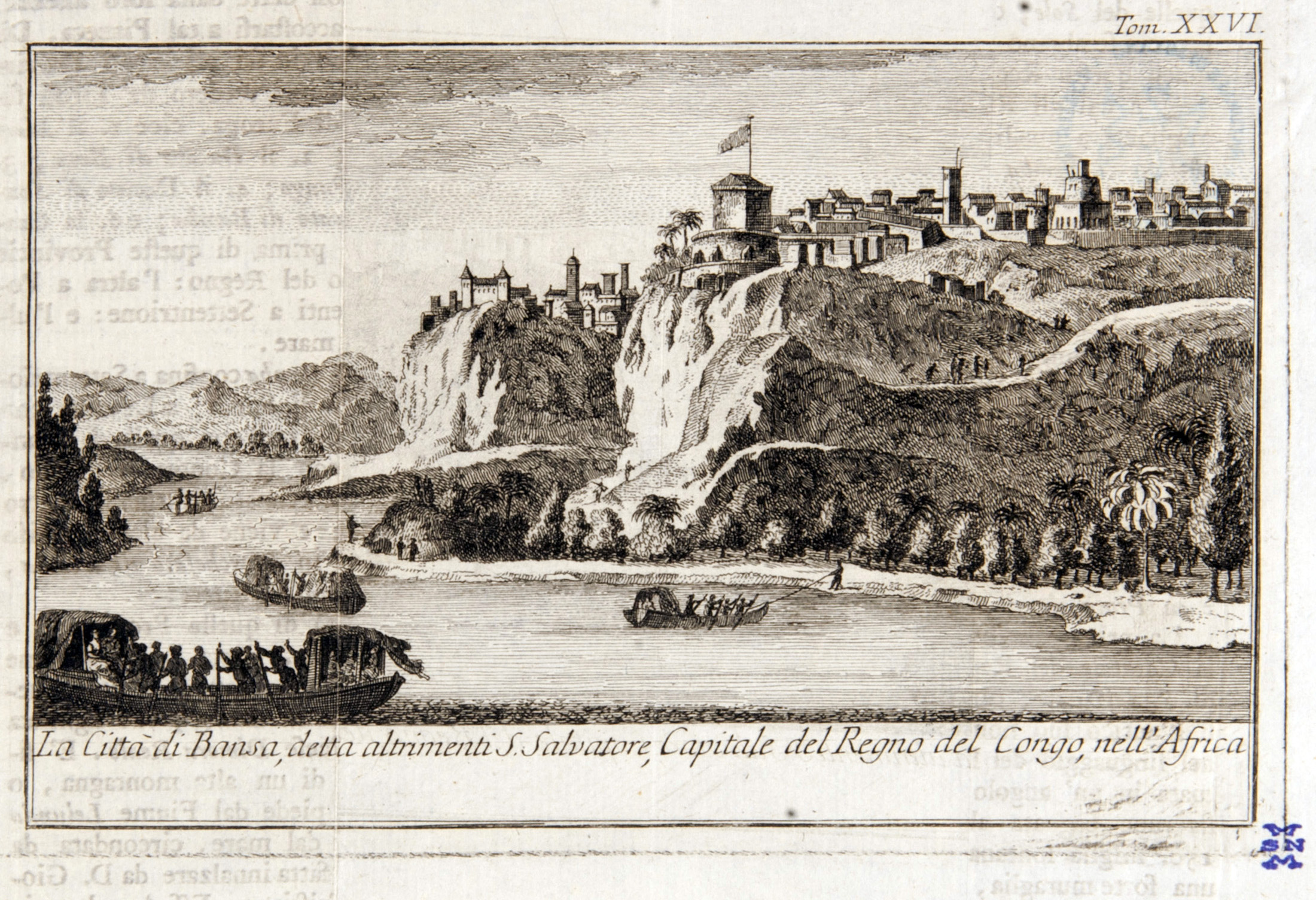
M'banza-Kongo, 1766

- Baía Farta site
- Capangombe-Santo António
- Capangombe-Velho
- Dungo
- Feti site
- Ganda site
- Leba Cave
- M'banza-Kongo
- Pedra do Feitiço site
- Tchipopilu
- Tchitundo Hulo

== Notable archaeologists ==
- António de Almeida
- Henri Breuil
- José Camarate França
- John Desmond Clark
- Carlos Ervedosa
- Miguel Fonseca Ramos
- Louis Leakey
- Fernando Mouta
- Joaquim Santos Júnior

== See also ==
- Archaeology of Africa
- Precolonial history of Angola
