= Museum of the Armed Forces (Angola) =

Military museum in Luanda, Angola

- Museu das Forças Armadas
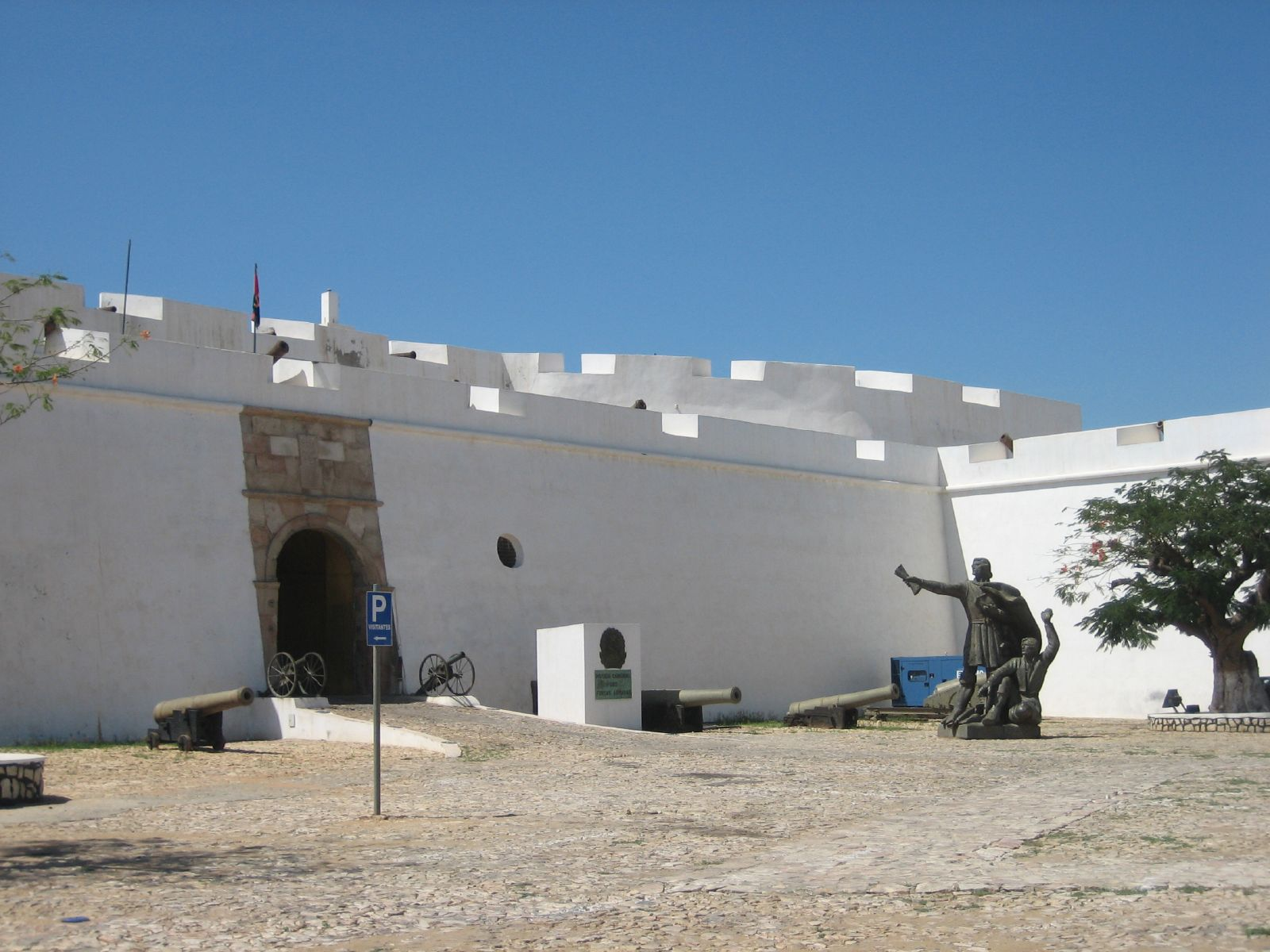
- Entrance of the Fortaleza de São Miguel de Luanda
- Established: 1975
- Location: Fortaleza de São Miguel de Luanda, Luanda, Angola
- Coordinates: 8°48′27″S 13°13′23″E

The Museum of the Armed Forces (Portuguese: Museu das Forças Armadas) is located in Fortaleza de São Miguel de Luanda, in the Ingombota District of Luanda, Angola.

Founded in 1975, following the independence of Angola, the museum includes bi-motor airplanes, combat vehicles, and diverse arms and artifacts used during the Angolan War of Independence (1961–1974), the South African Border War (1966-1991), and the Angolan Civil War (1975–2002).

The museum also contains statuary which ornamented the avenues and plazas of colonial Luanda, which were removed after independence. These include the statue of Diogo Cão, the first European to set foot in Angola, of Paulo Dias de Novais, founder of the city of São Paulo da Assunção de Luanda, of Vasco da Gama, and of famous Portuguese poet Luís de Camões, among others.

The museum grounds and outdoor exhibits, long in a delipidated state, underwent an extensive restoration project at some point between 1997 and 2013.

== List of Exhibits ==
=== Vehicles ===
- BRDM-2
- BTR-152
- Buffel
- Eland-90
- GAZ-66
- Panhard AML-90
- Renault 6
- UAZ-469
- Withings Recovery Vehicle (SAMIL-100)

=== Towed Artillery ===
- 15 cm sFH 18

=== Miscellaneous ===
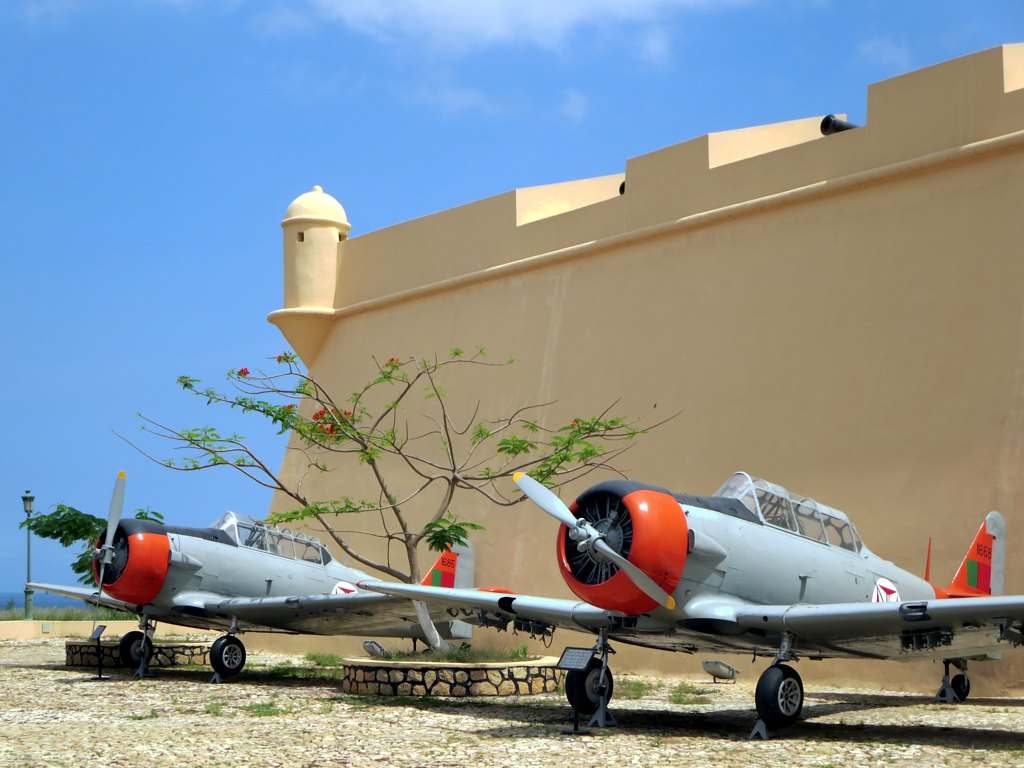
Former Portuguese North American T-6G Texan trainers now on display on the National Museum of Military History in Luanda, Angola, 2015.

- 9K38 Igla
- Ox-wagon
- T-6 Texan
- Wreckage of downed South African Air Force Puma and Mirage IIIRZ
