= Igreja da Nossa Senhora do Cabo =

Church in Luanda, Angola

Igreja da Nossa Senhora do Cabo (English: Church of Our Lady of the Cape) is a church in the Ingombota District of Luanda, Angola. It is the oldest church in the city of Luanda, founded in 1575 by Portuguese traders, who dedicated it to Our Lady of the Immaculate Conception. After the reconquest of territory from the Dutch in 1648, reconstruction of the church started, and when completed in 1669 it was given its current name. In 1854, it became a parish church. The stone church is characterized by having a secular cross and an elegant side tower.
