= S.B. Benfica (Benguela) =

Angolan football club

Sport Benguela e Benfica
- Full name: Sport Benguela e Benfica
- Ground: Estádio Municipal de Benguela; Benguela, Angola

Sport Benguela e Benfica is an Angolan football club based in Benguela in western Angola, south of Luanda.

In 1943 the team won the Girabola.

== Honours ==
- Girabola: 1943
