= Museu Nacional de História Natural de Angola =

The Museu Nacional de História Natural de Angola
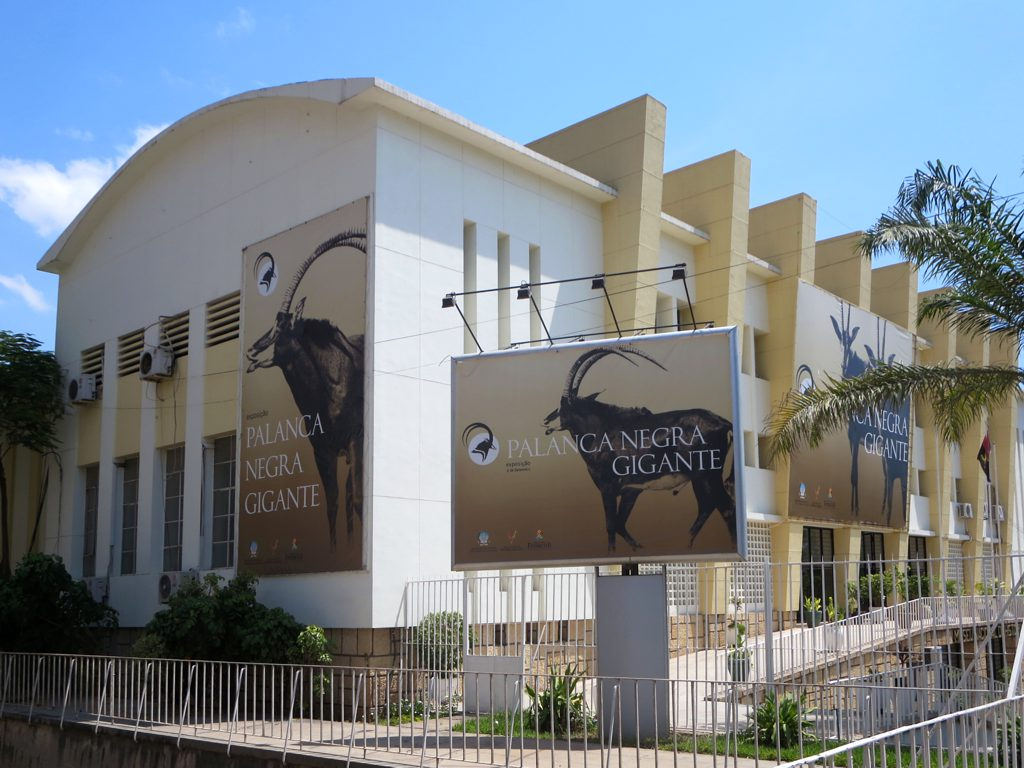
- The exterior of the Natural History Museum of Angola
- Established: 1938
- Location: Largo do Kinaxixe, in the city of Luanda, Angola.

The Museu Nacional de História Natural de Angola (National Museum of Natural History of Angola) is located in the Ingombota District of the city of Luanda, Angola. Established in 1938, it is the only museum of natural history in Angola.

== History ==
The museum was established in 1938 as the Museu de Angola, and was originally housed in the Fortress of São Miguel, initially with departments of Ethnography, History, Zoology, Botany, Geology, Economics and Art. A library and colonial history archive was added. In 1956, the museum collection moved to its current 3-story building in Ingombota. It is located in the center of Ingombota in Largo do Kinaxixe.

== Collection ==
The National Museum of Natural History features a large collection related to the country's natural history and rich and varied fauna. The museum aims to investigate, collect, conserve and disseminate to the public the natural resources that reflect Angola's biodiversity, in order to promote scientific knowledge. The museum has three floors with large halls, where there are taxidermied specimens of mammals, fish, cetaceans, insects, reptiles and birds. The spaces are decorated to try to reproduce the natural habitat of the species. The museum's estate also includes vast and rich collections of mollusks, butterflies and shells, many of which were used as currency on the West African coast. The museum holds specimens such as the skeleton of a 15-metre whale, and a taxidermied giant sable antelope, only found in Angola.
