= Avenida 4 de Fevereiro =

Road in Luanda, Angola

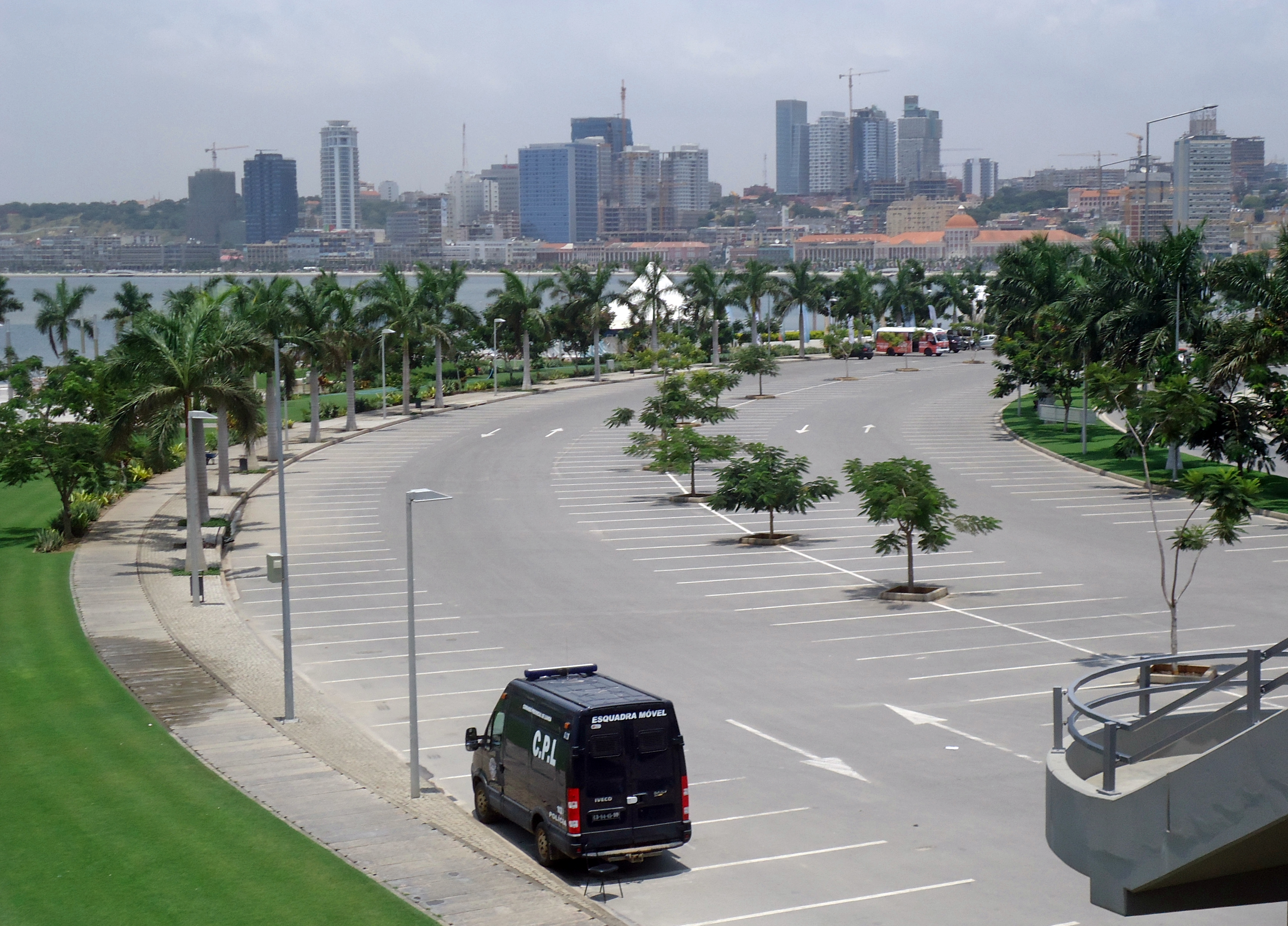
Avenida 4 de Fevereiro

The avenida 4 de Fevereiro (in English: February 4th avenue) is an important road artery of the city of Luanda in Angola. Passing along the coast of the Bay of Luanda, in colonial times it was known as Avenida de Paulo Dias de Novais, in honor of the founder of the city in 1576. One of the most prestigious avenues of the city, it contains the buildings of various ministries, utilities, hotels and headquarters of major companies and multinationals in the country, and the Agostinho Neto University and the National Bank of Angola.
