= Nossa Senhora da Nazaré =

Church in Luanda, Angola

Coordinates: 8°48′29″S 13°14′22″E

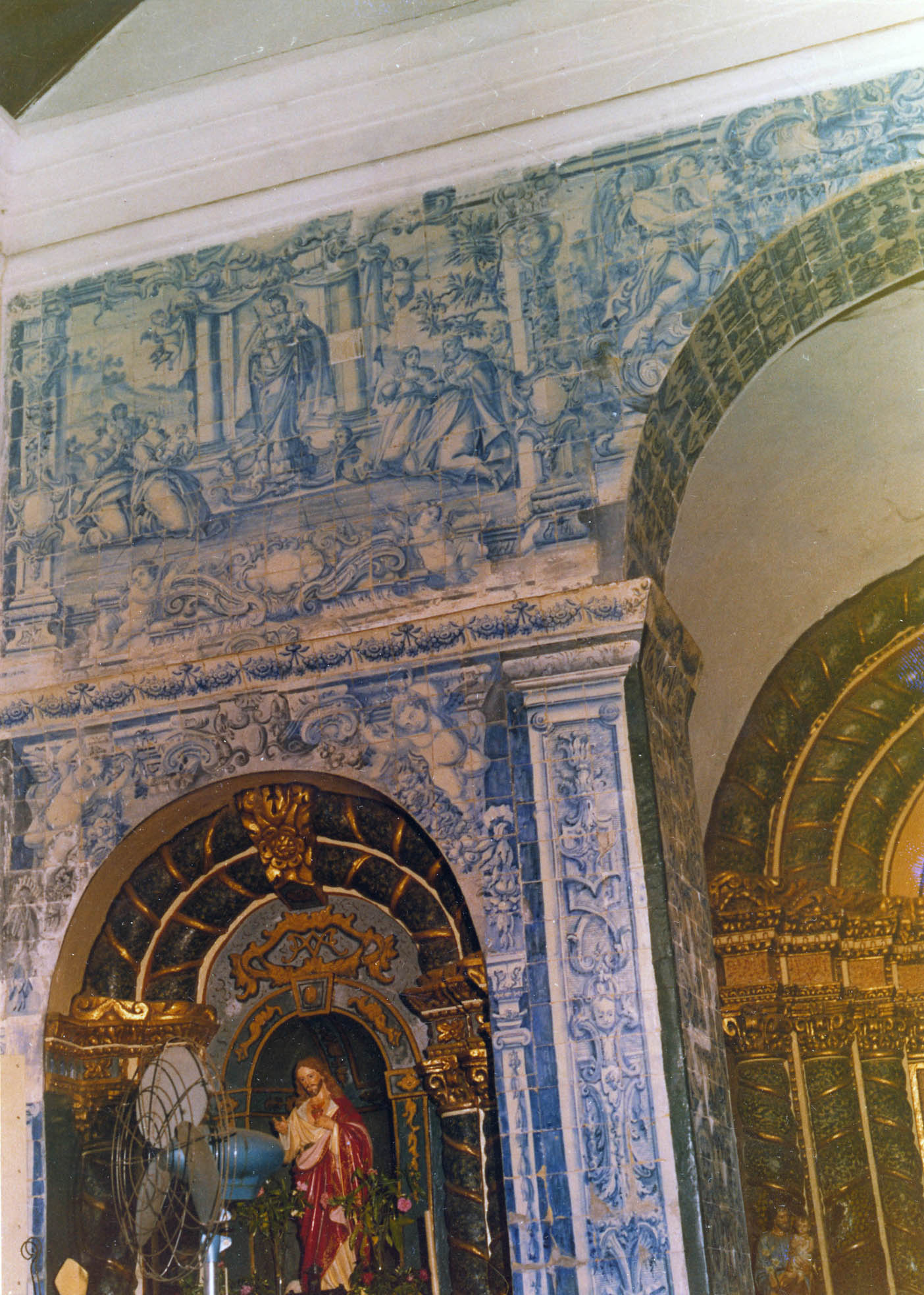
Interior of Igreja de Nossa Senhora da Nazaré

Igreja de Nossa Senhora da Nazaré (Our Lady of Nazareth Church) is a colonial church in Luanda, Angola, built in 1664. It is located in the centre of the city, overlooking Luanda Bay.

== History ==
The church was built in 1664 by Governor André Vidal de Negreiros (1606–1680) in gratitude to the Virgin Mary for safeguarding his ship during a storm which occurred while he was travelling to Angola. A plaque on the wall, however, indicates it was in fact dedicated to victory at the Battle of Ambuila in 1665. The building was reconstructed in the late 19th century.

== Architecture ==
The little church consists of a rather austere rectangular nave and chancel built in a simple Baroque architecture style. The original plans show that the facade was to be flanked by two towers but these were never built. Instead, there is only a small bell tower. The church was listed as a national monument under Decree No. 135 of 28 June 1932.
