= Ilha de Luanda =

Island (sandspit) in Angola

Ilha do Cabo Ilha de Luanda
- Spit
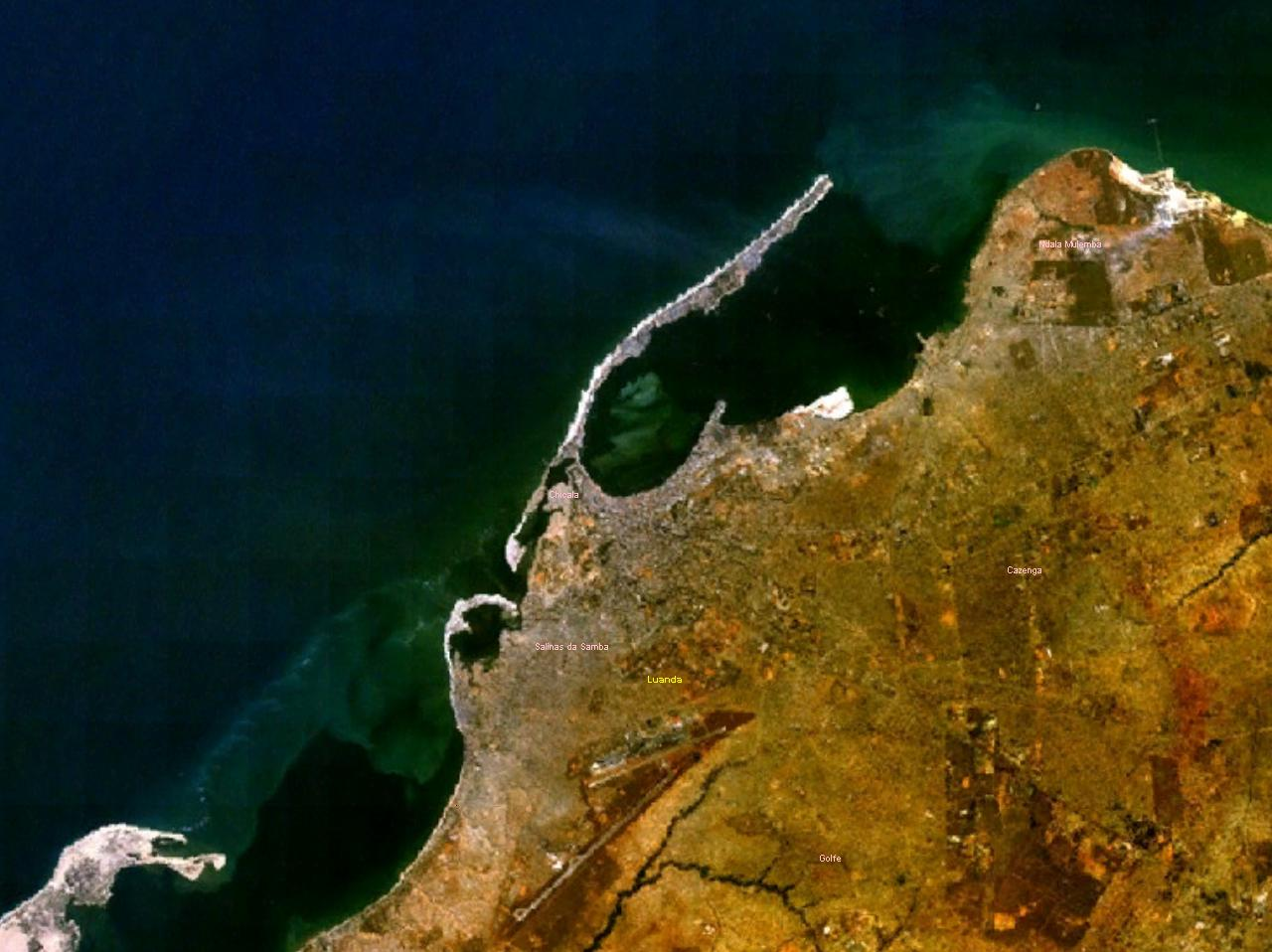
- Ilha de Cabo, a sandspit off the shore of Luanda

- Coordinates: 8°46′43″S 13°14′37″E
- Location: Luanda Province, Angola

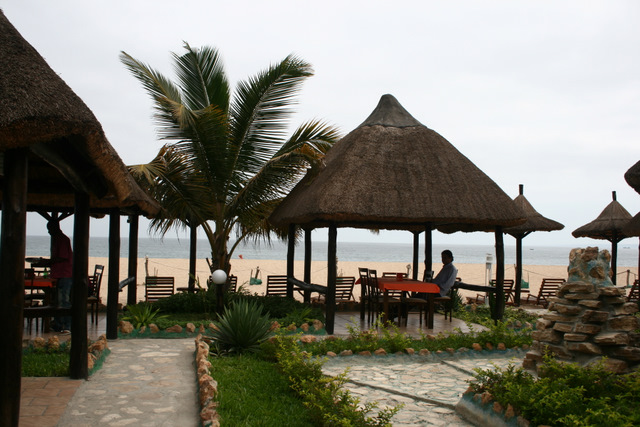
Thatched huts for tourists on Luanda Island.

Ilha do Cabo (English: Cape Island) typically known as Ilha de Luanda (English: Island of Luanda) is a spit off the shore of Luanda, the capital of Angola, a country on the continents' southwestern coast. It consists of a low sandy strip formed by sedimentation. In administrative terms, the peninsula belongs to the municipality of Ingombota in the Luanda Province.

== History ==
When Paulo Dias de Novais, a Portuguese navigator, arrived here in 1575 with several hundred soldiers and settlers, the island was inhabited by the Axi-lwanda, a subgroup of the Ambundu people which was tributary to the Kingdom of Kongo. The island was an important location to collect the shell of a sea snail (Olivella nana), known locally as nzimbu or zimbo, which was the universal currency in Kongo and surrounding region of Central Africa. The Portuguese settled here for a while, gaining control of the currency, before they decided to establish themselves on the mainland, opposite the island. They started to use the name of the African inhabitants as a name for the island and the town, spelling it first "Loanda" and then "Luanda".

The Ilha, as it is called colloquially by the population, is connected with the city through a narrow passage and is located at the foot of the Fortress of São Miguel. This is an area where residents can get away from the stresses of the capital, especially on weekends. A wide variety of hotels and clubs with bars and restaurants, as well as flea markets and marinas attract visitors.

The first church built by the Portuguese in Angola, the church of Nossa Senhora do Cabo is located here. It was erected by some 40 settlers in 1575, before they moved to the mainland in 1576, founding the present capital of Luanda.

== Culture ==
The "União Mundo da Ilha" (a carnival group), was founded in 1968 by residents of the island. The group has about 150 members that aim at Varina and Semba as their main style of dance.

The Clube Náutico da Ilha de Luanda sports club is situated on the island.

Well-known dishes from this area are Mufete and Muzongué (a type of broth).
