= Museu Nacional de Antropologia (Angola) =

National Museum of Anthropology (Angola)

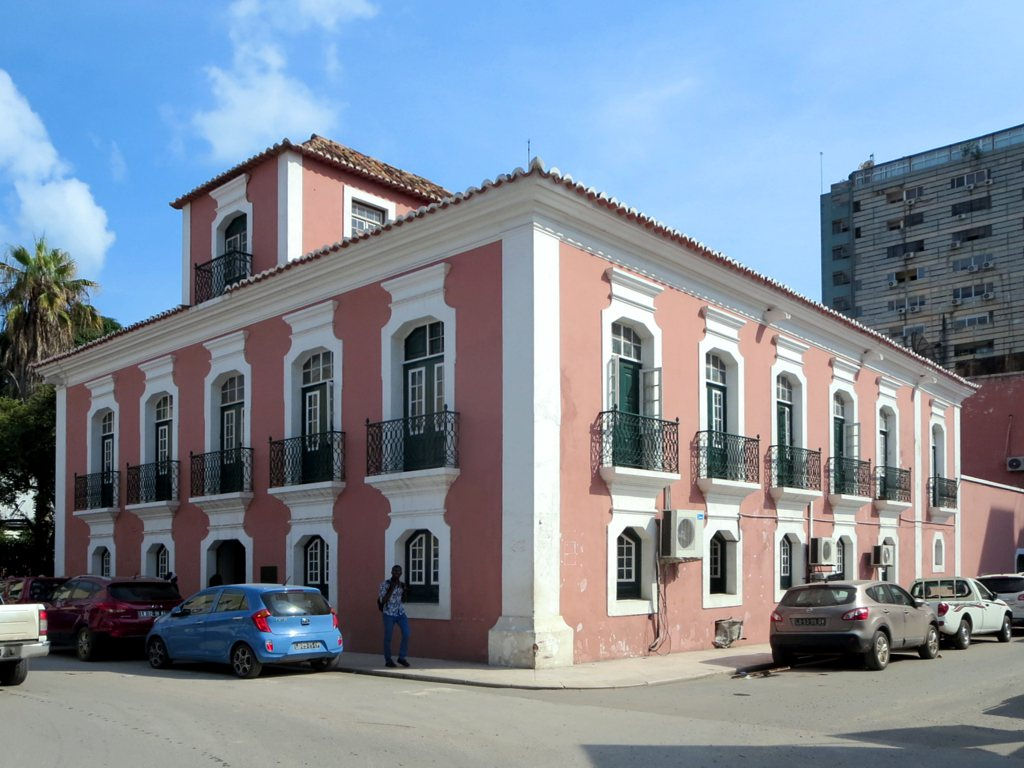
- Location: Angola
- Coordinates: 8°48′49″S 13°13′40″E
- Website: www.museuantropologia.angoladigital.net
- Location of Museu Nacional de Antropologia

The Museu Nacional de Antropologia (National Museum of Anthropology) is an anthropological museum in the Ingombota District of the city of Luanda, Angola. Founded on 13 November 1976, it is a cultural and scientific institution, dedicated to the collection, research, conservation, presentation and dissemination of the Angolan cultural heritage.

== Collections and activities ==
The museum consists of 14 rooms spread over two floors which house over 6000 historical cultural objects, including farm implements, hunting and fishing items, iron foundry, pottery, jewelry, musical instruments, women's rights memorabilia and photographs of the Khoisan people. Various traditional musical instruments are displayed, and visitors can hear a demonstration of the use of the marimba. Other major attractions of the museum are its rustic furnace for melting iron, and its room of the masks, featuring the symbols of the rituals of the Bantu people. In addition to its permanent collection, the museum also organizes temporary exhibitions.

== International cooperation ==
On May 17, 2022, the German cultural institute in Luanda, Goethe-Institut Angola, handed over the translation of the complete, multi-volume object list of the Angola collection of the Ethnological Museum Berlin to the Angolan Ministry of Culture. This follows a convention between the museums in Berlin and Luanda for cooperation, focussing on the conservation and restoration of cultural property and the re-evaluation of both museums' histories in colonial contexts.
