= List of newspapers in Angola =

This is a list of newspapers in Angola.

Newspaper	Location	First issued	Publisher	Website	Notes
Actual		1994 or 2003			Weekly
Agora	Luanda	1996			Weekly
O Angolense	Luanda	1997			Privately owned weekly newspaper
O Apostolado	Luanda				Catholic monthly newspaper
A Capital	Luanda	2003			Biweekly or weekly
Comercio Actualidade		1994			
Correio da Semana	Luanda				Weekly
Diario de Luanda	Luanda		Agencia de Noticias de Informacoes		
Diario da Republica	Luanda				Government bulletin
Era Nova	Luanda				Weekly
Expansão	Luanda				
Folha 8	Luanda	1994		Website	Private weekly (formerly biweekly)
O Independente	Luanda				Weekly
Jornal de Angola	Luanda		Agencia Angola Press	Website	Government newspaper
Jornal de Benguela	Benguela	1912			
Jornal de Congo	Uíge				Publication status unknown.
Jornal do Rangel	Luanda	1997			Neighborhood paper
Novo Jornal	Luanda			Website	Private weekly
O Pais	Luanda			Website	Private weekly
Palanca News and Business	Luanda	31 January 2003			Targeted at South Africans living in Angola.
A Palavra	Luanda	2003			Weekly
Semanário Angolense		2003			Weekly
Tempos Novos		1995			

== See also ==
- Media of Angola

== Bibliography ==
- Antônio Hohlfeldt [in Portuguese]; Caroline Corso de Carvalho (2012). "A imprensa angolana no âmbito da história da imprensa colonial de expressão portuguesa". Intercom: Revista Brasileira de Ciências da Comunicação (in Portuguese). 35. São Paulo: Sociedade Brasileira de Estudos Interdisciplinares da Comunicação. ISSN 1809-5844 – via Redalyc.org.
