= Fortress of São Miguel =

17th-century Portuguese fortress in Angola

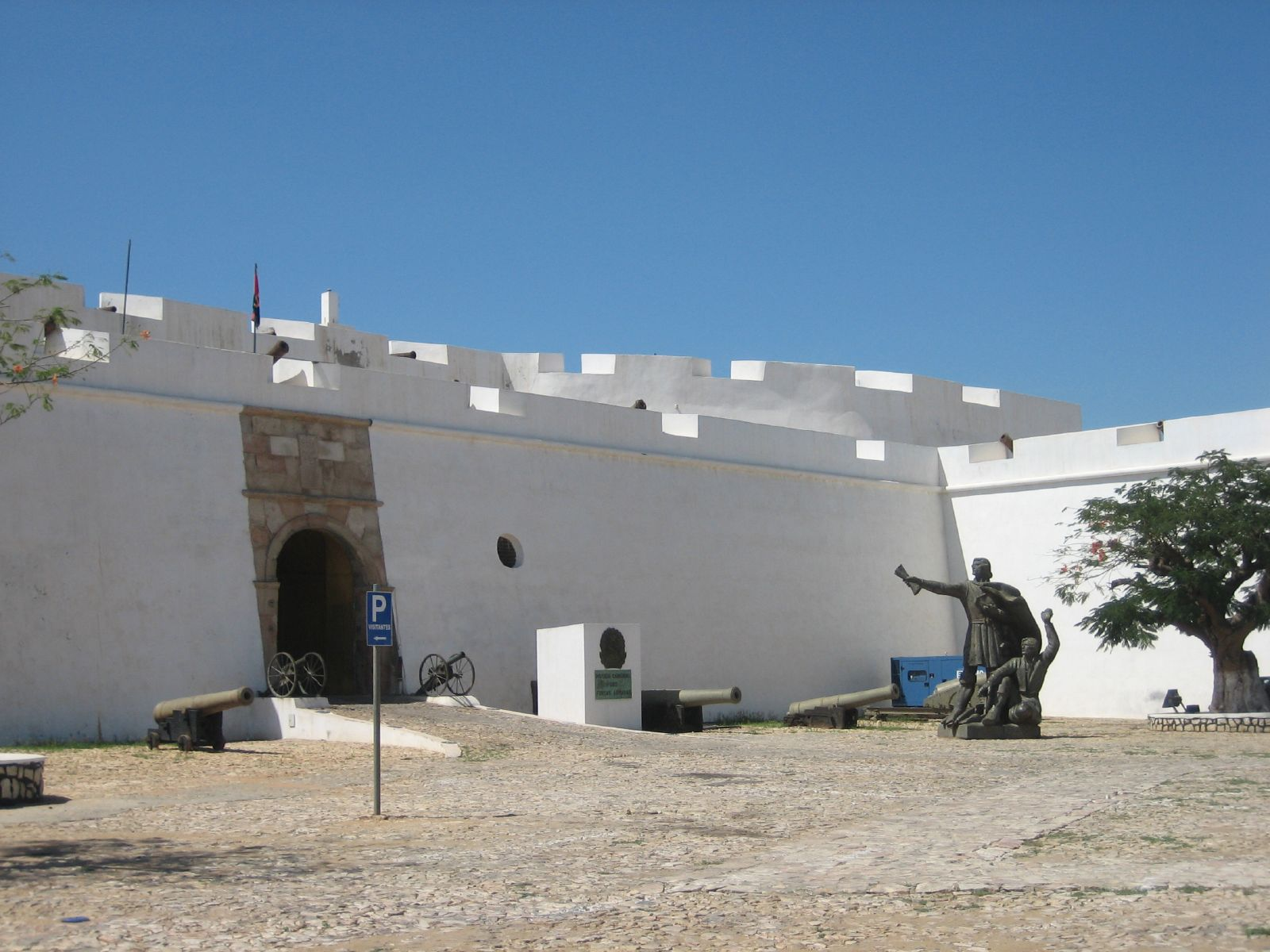
- Fortress of São Miguel
- Interactive map of Fortress of São Miguel
- 8.8083°S 13.2234°E
- Location: Luanda, Angola.

History
- Built: 1576

Site notes
- Owner: Paulo Dias de Novais. Angola Armed Forces

Fortaleza de São Miguel or Saint Michael Fortress was a Portuguese fortress built in 1576 in the Ingombota District of Luanda, Angola. During Dutch rule in Angola between 1641 and 1648, the fort was known as Fort Aardenburgh.

== History ==
São Miguel fort was built in 1576 by Paulo Dias de Novais. It became the administrative center of the colony in 1627. It was a major site for slave traffic that was exported to Brazil. The fort was for many years a self-contained town protected by thick walls encrusted with cannons.

Inside the fort, elaborate ceramic tiles tell the story of Angola from early years. The courtyard has large, imposing statues of Portugal's first king, the first European to reach Angola, explorers Diogo Cão and Vasco da Gama, and other notables.

Until 1975, the fortress served as the headquarters of the Commander-in-Chief of the Portuguese Armed Forces in Angola.

Today, it holds the Museum of the Armed Forces. Between 1938 and 1958, it held the Museu de Angola, until that was relocated. The fort was renamed and adapted as the Museu Nacional de História Militar.

== Gallery ==
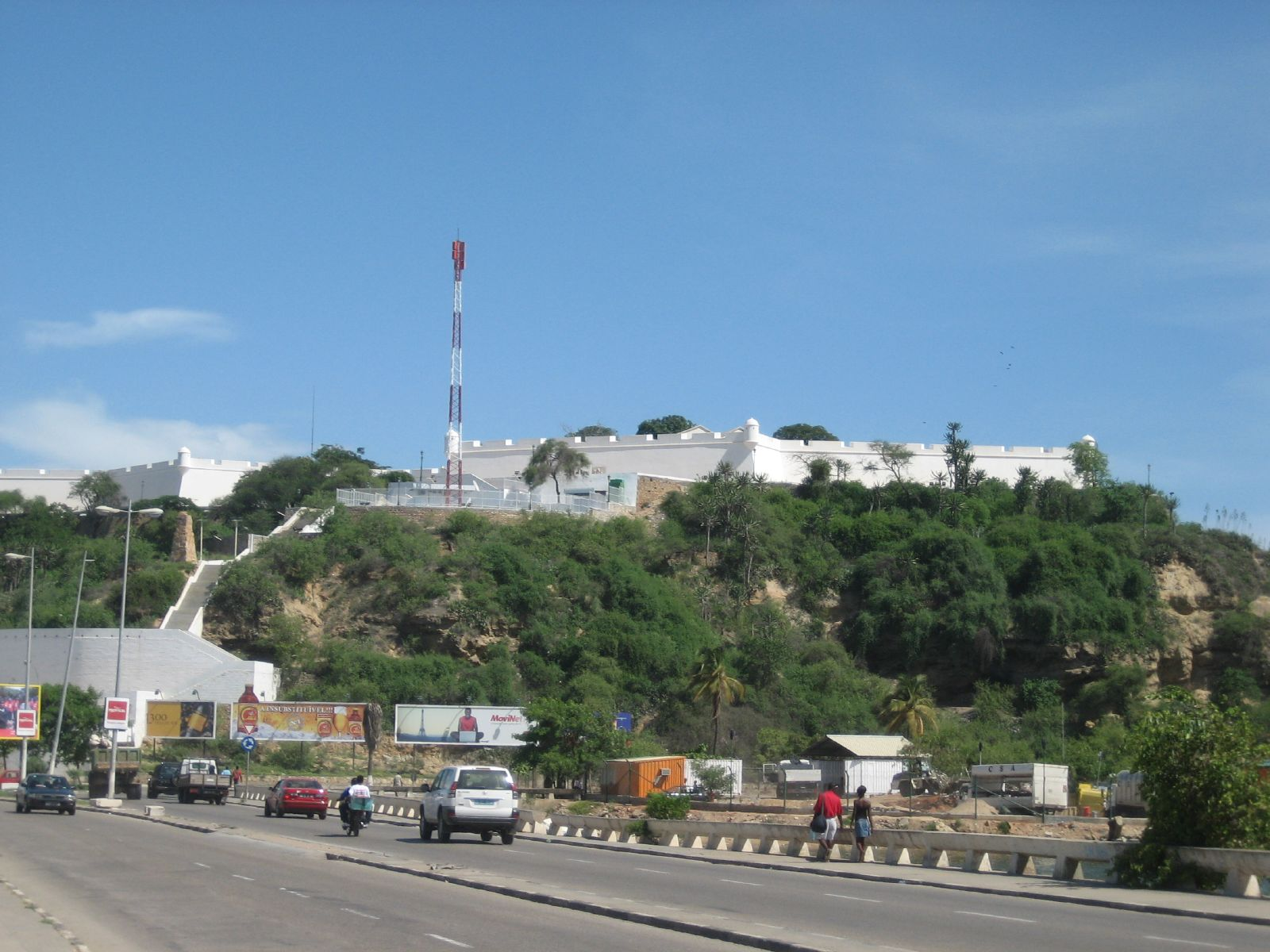
Fortress of São Miguel

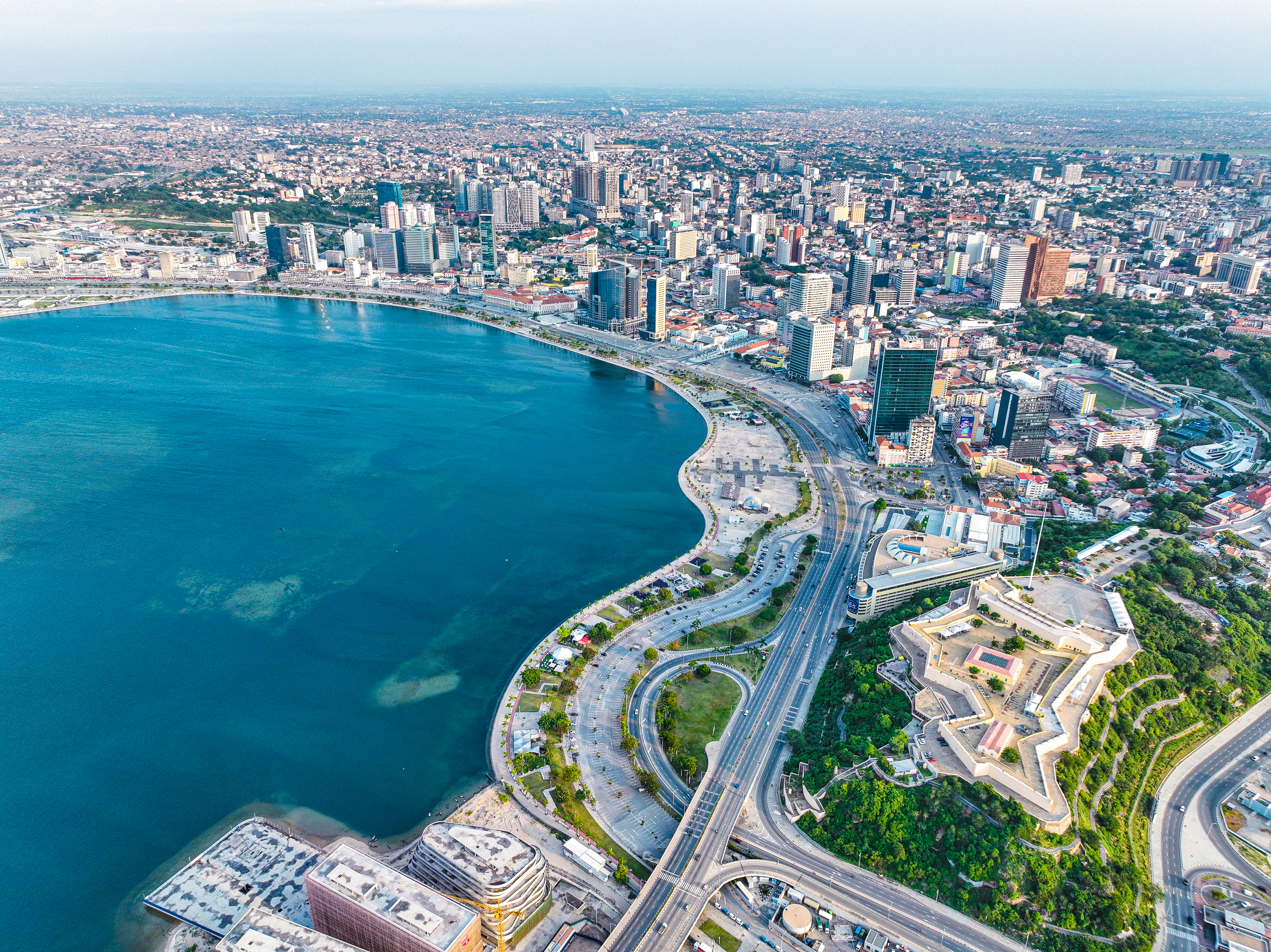
Aerial view (right bottom)

== See also ==
- Colonial history of Angola
