= Gertrude Kayaga Mulindwa =

Ugandan librarian (born 1956)

- Born: 1956 (age 69–70); Uganda
- Citizenship: Uganda
- Education: Makerere University (Bachelor of Library & Information Science); University of Wales (Master of Library and Information Science)
- Occupation: Librarian
- Years active: 1980–present
- Title: Director, National Library of Uganda
- Successor: Adonia Katungisa

Gertrude Kayaga Mulindwa is a Ugandan librarian. She was the second director of the National Library of Uganda, and is the current director of the African Library and Information Association and Institution. She also holds various voluntary positions at organizations that promote literacy and library services throughout Uganda.

== Background and education ==
Mulindwa attended Makerere University in Uganda and the University of Wales. In 2019, she was part of the Public Library Association Leadership Academy's first African graduating class.

== Work in Botswana ==
Mulindwa worked as director of the National Library Service of Botswana in Gaborone. She helped develop the national bibliography, called The Botswana Collection, starting in the early 1980s, when the nation was far behind others in resources and technology. In the 1990s, the bibliography grew, not just because of a growing number of publications in Botswana, but because of the implementation of new resources and technology such as computerized systems used with the implementation of ISBN for cataloging. Different media, such as video, were now included in the collection, along with publications in different languages; not just everything published, but everything filmed in Botswana, and all reports of all research done in Botswana were added to the Botswana Collection. Mulindwa has argued that the preservation of resources through bibliography is not just for historical posterity, but to spread knowledge of what is available for public use in a nation with little reading material.

In addition to the efforts of literacy programs, Mulindwa and others advocated the need for post-literacy programs to help build and maintain literacy skills and reading culture in Botswana. Village Reading Rooms were created in the 1980s and 1990s to help foster a reading-friendly culture, taking the concept of the public library out into remote villages to make reading material available to all. In 2000, Mulindwa analyzed the efforts of the Village Reading Rooms and presented findings at the IFLA conference in Israel.

== Work in Uganda ==
Mulindwa returned to Uganda in 2000, where she worked as head librarian for Uganda Martyrs University, Nkozi, for three years. She then became director of the National Library of Uganda (NLU).

Despite a lack of funding, among other problems, the leadership of NLU helps communities to run their own libraries. Mulindwa commented on the NLU's relationship with small community libraries, "We set policies, give them guidelines on standards and produce manuals for them on how libraries are run. But they do the day-to-day running of the libraries."

Under Mulindwa's leadership, the National Library of Uganda started the Digital Bookmobile Project with an American organization called Anywhere Books. With a computer containing internet-archived public-domain documents and a printer, the bookmobile could print books on-demand in any village it traveled to. By taking NLU out of the library building and into the villages with new technology, the library offered more flexibility and access to resources.

Mulindwa is the vice chairperson of the National Book Trust of Uganda, which promotes a reading culture in Uganda through programs like National Book Week. She is also co-founder and the then treasurer of Uganda Community Libraries Association-UgCLA, which is now known as the Community Libraries Association of Uganda (COLAU). It is an umbrella organization for community libraries in Uganda which provides resources to communities allowing them to start, run, and maintain their own libraries. She is on the Children's Literacy Committee of Ka Tutandike, an NGO that encourages reading, and advocates for a healthy childhood and equal rights among Ugandan citizens.
