= List of Libraries in Uganda =

| No. | Library | Location | Region | Year of Establishment | Website | Type |
|---|---|---|---|---|---|---|
| 1. | Access Knowledge Africa | Mukono District | Central | 2010 | https://accessknowledgeafrica.org/ | Community Library |
| 2. | Education and Development Initiatives Uganda | Njeru | East | 2014 | https://www.adultslearnuganda.org/ | Community Library |
| 3. | Adult Literacy and Entrepreneurship Association (ALEA) | Tororo district | East | 2005 | | Community Library |
| 4. | Aga Khan University Library, Kampala | Kampala District | | 1997 | https://www.aku.edu/library/ea/fhs-kampala/Pages/home.aspx | Academic Library |
| 5. | Alebtong Community Library Centre | Alebtong District | North | | https://alebtongfoundation.org/ | Community Library |
| 6. | Amuno Rural Hub | Bukedea District | East | 2022 | https://amuno.org/ | Community Library |
| 7. | Art of a Child | Entebbe and Wakiso | Central | 2016 | https://artofachild.org/ | Community Library |
| 8. | Ba Nga Afayo Initiative Uganda Limited | Kayunga District | Central | 2016 | https://bangaafayo.org/ | Community Library |
| 9. | Blessed Foster Family Foundation | Masaka District | Central | 2004 | | Community Library |
| 10. | BonnaBaana Association Community Library | Nakaseke District | Central | 2007 | | Community Library |
| 11. | Book drive –Read to learn foundation | Muyenga | Central | 2017 | https://readtolearnfdn.org/our-story/ | Community Library |
| 12. | Bugiri Public Library | Bugiri District | East | 2015 | | Public Library |
| 13. | Bugolobi Condominium Library | Bugolobi | Central | | | Community Library |
| 15. | Bunabumali Good Samaritan | Bunabumali village, Buwali parish, Bubiita County, Bududa District | East | 2004 | | Community Library |
| 16. | Bunalwenhi Community Library | Iganga District | East | | | Community Library |
| 17. | Bundibugyo Community Library | Bundibugyo District | West | 2015 | | Public Library |
| 18. | Busesa Community Library | Bugweri District | East | 2015 | https://kitakulefoundation.org/ | Community Library |
| 19. | Busia Cross-Border Community Library (The 6 Community Library Services) | Busia District | East | | | Community Library |
| 20. | Busolwe Public Library | Butaleja District | East | 1996 | https://busolwepubliclibrary.yolasite.com/ | Community Library |
| 21. | Busongora Rural Information Centre (BRIC) | Kasese District | West | 2005 | | Community Library |
| 22. | Bwera Information Centre | Kasese District | West | 2002 | | Community Library |
| 23. | Caezaria Complex Public Library | Buikwe District | Central | 2002 | | Community Library |
| 24. | Centre for Youth Driven Development Initiatives (CFYDDI) | Gayaza | Central | 2013 | | Community Library |
| 25. | Community Network For Orphans Uganda | Kyanja | Central | 2017 | https://www.cnfoug.org/ | Community Library |
| 26. | Criciform Life Community Library | Bulenga | Central | 2020 | https://cflim.org/ | Community Library |
| 27. | DWW Children’s Resource Centre (Budadiri CRC) | Sironko District | Central | | https://dwwclrc.org/ | Community Library |
| 28. | Friends Children’s Library | Kasangati | Central | | | Community Library |
| 29. | Friends of Buvuuya | Mukono District | Central | | | Community Library |
| 30. | Good Shepherd Community Library | Hoima District | West | 2013 | | Community Library |
| 31. | Gulu Book Point Club | Gulu District | North | 2022 | | Community Library |
| 32. | Hands of Action Uganda (formerly Randa Farmers) | Mbale District | East | | | Community Library |
| 33. | Iddi Basajjabalaba Memorial Library: Kampala International University main library | Ggaba | Central | 2001 | https://pmldaily.com/news/2019/02/kampala-international-university-launches-digital-library-today.html | Academic Library |
| 34. | Ibanda Community Library | Ibanda District | West | 2014 | | Community Library |
| 35. | Ibanda Municipal Council Library | Ibanda District | West | | | Public Library |
| 36. | Kabubbu Community Library | Gayaza | Central | 2003 | | Community Library |
| 37. | Kagoma International Tertiary Youth Foundation Library | Jinja District | East | | | Community Library |
| 38. | Kamwenge Communities Information Centre | Kamwenge District | West | 2010 | | Community Library |
| 39. | Katakwi community library | Katakwi District | East | 1997 | | Community Library |
| 40. | Kawempe Youth Centre | Kampala District | Central | 1999 | | Community Library |
| 41. | Kikandwa Environmental Association | Mityana District | Central | 1999 | https://www.kikandwaenvironmentalassociation.org/ | Community Library |
| 42. | Kitengesa Community Library | Masaka District | Central | 1999 | | Community Library |
| 43. | Kiwangala Community Library (Formerly COTFONE Community Library) | Lwengo District | Central | 2015 | https://cotfone.org/community-library/ | Community Library |
| 44. | Kyabutaika Community Library | Nakasongola District | Central | 1999 | | Community Library |
| 45. | Leadership Resource Centre and community library | Kagadi District | West | | | Community Library |
| 46. | Learn on Jesus Initiative Community Library | Luuka District | East | | | Community Library |
| 47. | Louis Gregory Memorial Bahai school Library, Tilling | Ngora | East | | | Community Library |
| 49. | Louis Gregory Memorial Bahai school Library, Odusai | Pallisa District | East | | | Community Library |
| 50. | Lugazi Community Library | Lugazi | Central | 2015 | | Community Library |
| 51. | Lukhonge Community Library | Mbale District | East | | | Community Library |
| 52. | Lutex Community Library | Mukono District | Central | 2022 | | Community Library |
| 53. | Magana Shoma Community Library | Kasese District | West | | | Community Library |
| 54. | Masese Child Development Centre | Jinja District | East | | | Community Library |
| 55. | Makerere University Library | Kampala | Central | 1949 | https://mulib.mak.ac.ug/ | Academic Library |
| 56. | M-LISADA Community Library | Nsambya | Central | 1996 | https://mlisada.org/other-educational-programs/ | Community Library |
| 57. | Monica Memorial Resource Centre | Arua District | North West | 2022 | | Community Library |
| 58. | Motherly Heart Organization | Busia District | East | 2023 | https://www.motherly-heart.org/ | Community Library |
| 59. | MPC library (Muwerevu Peter Monica Community Library) | Bujiri District | East | | | Community Library |
| 60. | Mukono Multipurpose Youth Organization | Mukono District | Central | 1992 | | Community Library |
| 61. | Mummy Foundation Community Library | Katwe, Makindye | Central | 2014 | | Community Library |
| 62. | Nadiket Community Library | Moroto District | North East | | | Public Library |
| 63. | Nagongera Public Library and Resource Centre | Tororo District | East | 2018 | | Public Library |
| 64. | Nakaseke Community Library | Nakaseke District | Central | 1997 | | Public Library |
| 65. | Namanya Memorial Community Library | Kampala | Central | 2020 | https://nmclibrary.org/home/about/ | Community Library |
| 66. | Nambi Sseppuuya Community Resource Centre | Jinja | East | 2007 | | Community Library |
| 67. | Nansana Youth Literacy and Development Association | Kampala | | | | Community Library |
| 68. | National Library of Uganda | Kampala | Central | 2003 | https://nlu.go.ug/ | National Library - Public Library |
| 69. | New Horizons Community Library | Namungoona | | | | Community Library |
| 70. | Marko Lukooya Memorial Community Library | Mukono District | | 2014 | | Community Library |
| 71. | Nyaka Blue Lupin Community Library, Kanungu, Nyaka Aids Foundation | Kanungu District | West | 2009 | https://nyakaglobal.org/history/ | Community Library |

== See also ==
- National Library of Uganda
- Kitengesa Community Library
- Busolwe Public Library
- Makerere University Library
