= Stella Nekuusa =

Ugandan librarian and administrator

Stella Bbosa Nekuusa
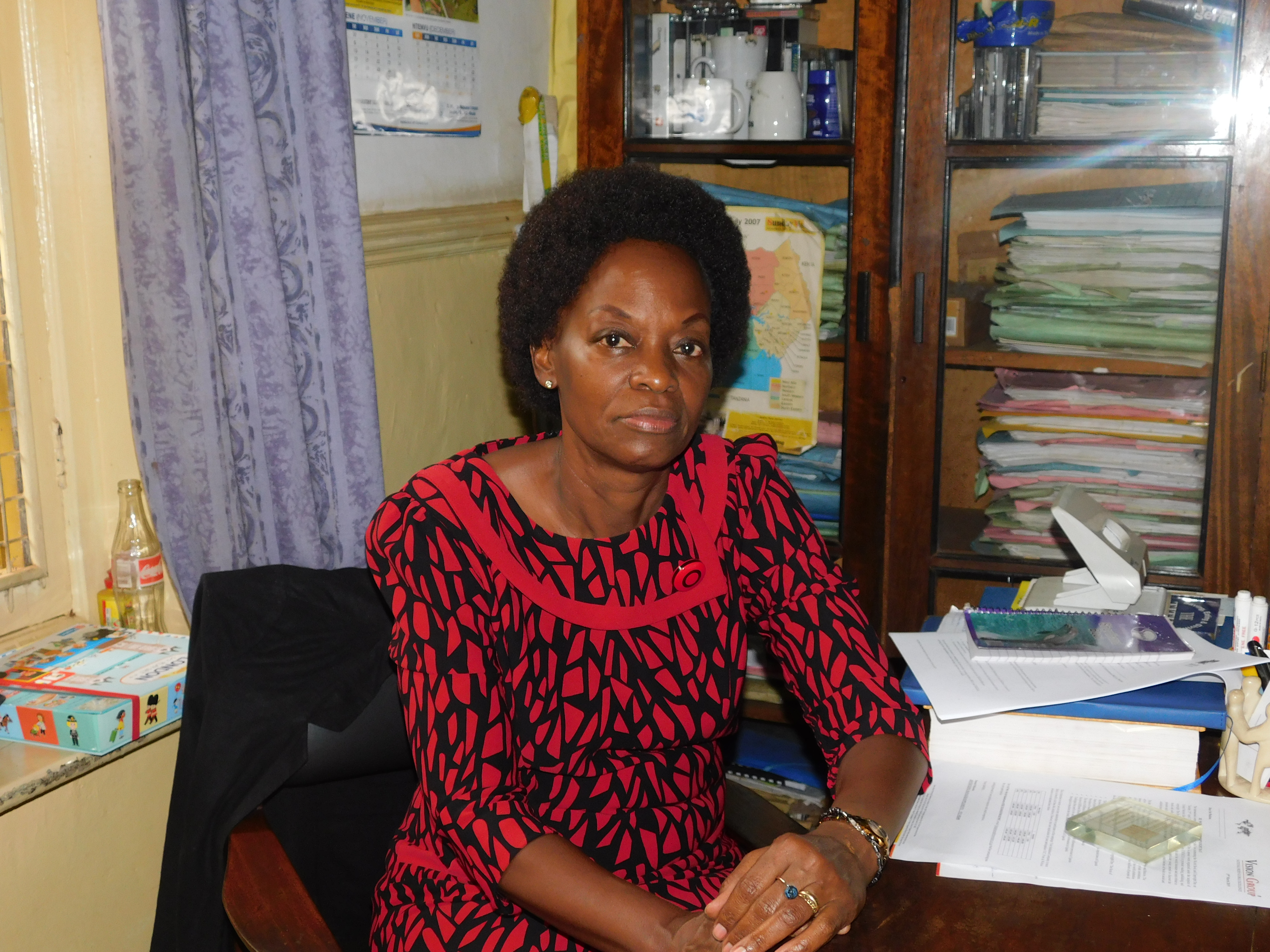
- Citizenship: Ugandan
- Occupations: librarian, businesswoman
- Title: Principal librarian at National Library of Uganda
- Spouse: Late Francis Nekuusa

Stella Bbosa Nekuusa, commonly known as Stella Nekuusa, is a Ugandan librarian and businesswoman. She worked as a principal librarian and head of library development at the National Library of Uganda (NLU) and the Coordinator of Book Donation. She has contributed to initiatives aimed at promoting reading culture and literacy in Uganda, such as the such as Electronic Information for Youth Employment (EIYE).

== Career ==
Nekuusa has served as the Principal Librarian and Head of Library Development Department at the National Library of Uganda and has been involved in various projects and collaborations such as such as the Electronic Information for Youth Employment, launch of free 4G Airtel internet in national libraries aimed to improve reading culture and literacy in Uganda, conducted with support from the National Book Trust of Uganda.

== Personal life ==
She was married to the late Francis Nekuusa, who died in 2021.

== Controversies ==
She and her late husband were in a legal dispute with Diamond Trust Bank (DTB) Uganda over a 10 billion loan. DTB claimed the couple owed the bank for loans used to support their businesses. However, through Kampala Associated Advocates (KAA), the couple denied the debt, arguing that DTB fraudulently credited and debited their accounts without their consent.
