= Adonia Katungisa =

Ugandan librarian and administrator

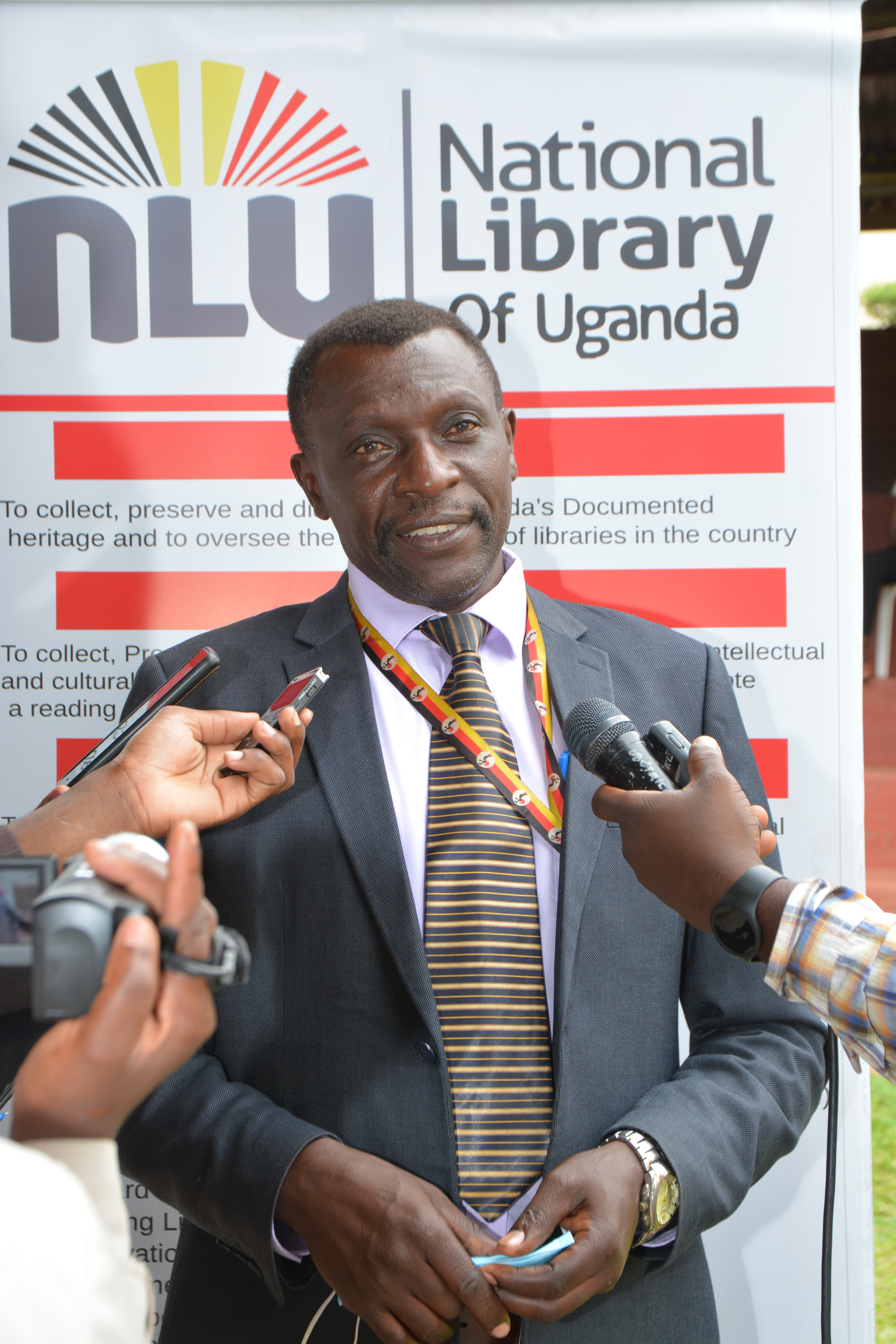
- Citizenship: Uganda
- Education: Makerere University (Bachelor of Library & Information Science); Makerere University (Master of Information Science); Makerere University (postgraduate diploma in Computer Science); African Leadership Academy
- Occupations: Librarian, administrator
- Employer: National Library of Uganda
- Predecessor: Gertrude Kayaga Mulindwa

Adonia Katungisa is a Ugandan librarian and administrator known for his contribution to the field of library and information science. He has been the director of the National Library of Uganda since 2018, and he has played a crucial role in shaping the library landscape in the country. Katungisa was the deputy director of the same institution. He contributes to academia as a part-time lecturer in Library and Information Science at Kyambogo University. He has been involved in initiatives to bridge the digital divide in Uganda, implementing digital literacy training programs to make computers accessible to the community.

== Background and education ==
Katungisa holds a master's degree of Science in Information Science from Makerere University, which he attained in 2005; a postgraduate diploma in Computer Science which he earned in 2001; and a bachelor's degree in Library and Information Science, which he earned from the same university in 1997. He is also an alumnus of the African Leadership Academy, a leadership training programme for African middle library managers.

== Career ==
Before becoming the director of the National Library of Uganda, Katungisa was the deputy director of the same institution from 2010 while Gertrude Kayaga Mulindwa was the director.
