= National Archives and Records Service =

National Archives and Records Service may refer to:

- Botswana National Archives and Records Services
- National Archives and Records Service of South Africa

== See also ==
- National Archives and Records Administration, United States
- List of national archives
