= Ivory Tower Building =

Coordinates: 0.3335°N 32.5675°E

Ivory Tower
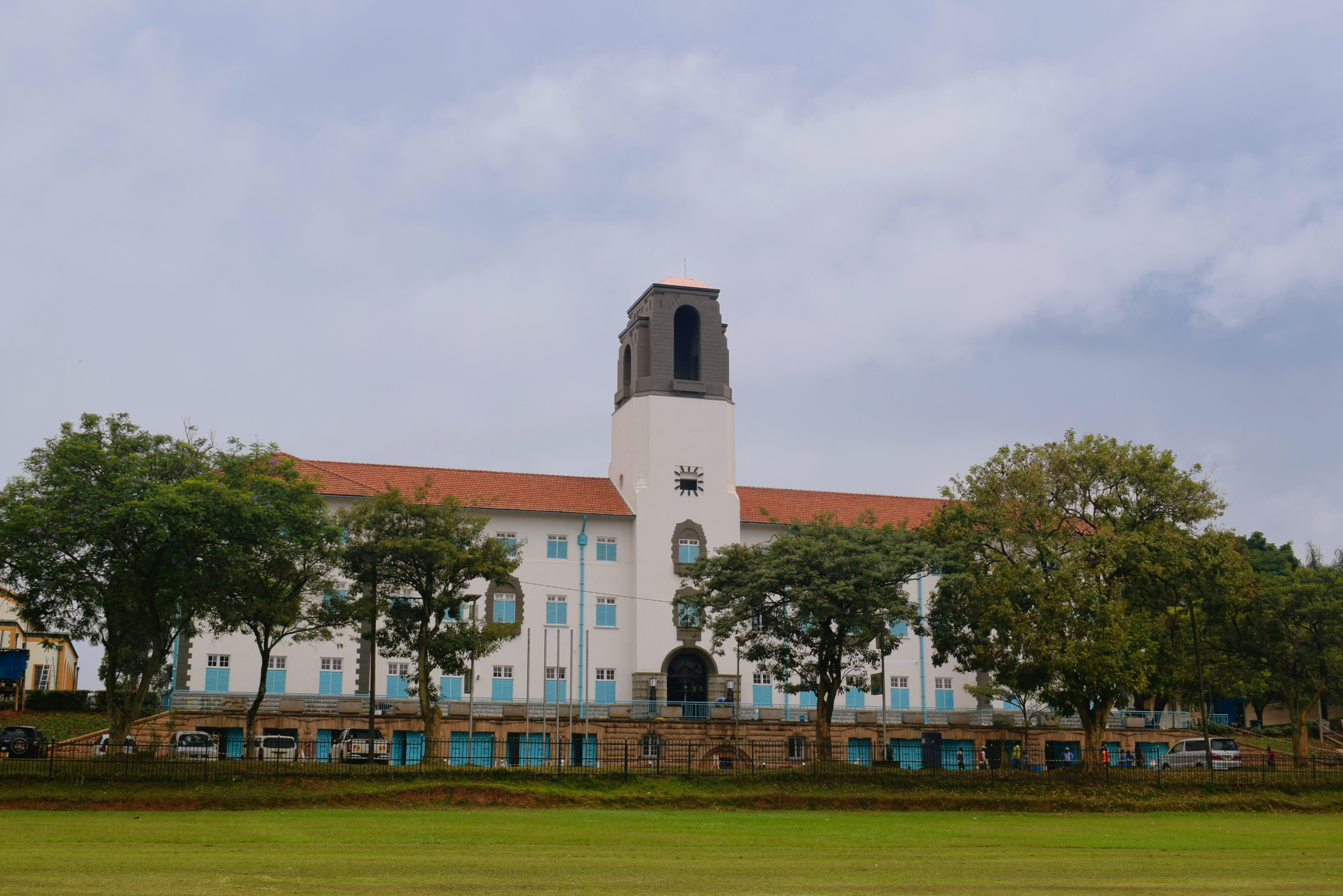
- Ivory Tower Building
- Interactive map of the Ivory Tower area

General information
- Architectural style: British Architecture
- Location: Makerere, Uganda
- Construction started: 1938
- Completed: 1941
- Opened: 1941
- Destroyed: 2020
- Owner: Makerere University
- Governing body: Makerere University

Design and construction
- Known for: Iconic main Administration building

Other information
- Facilities: Offices, library

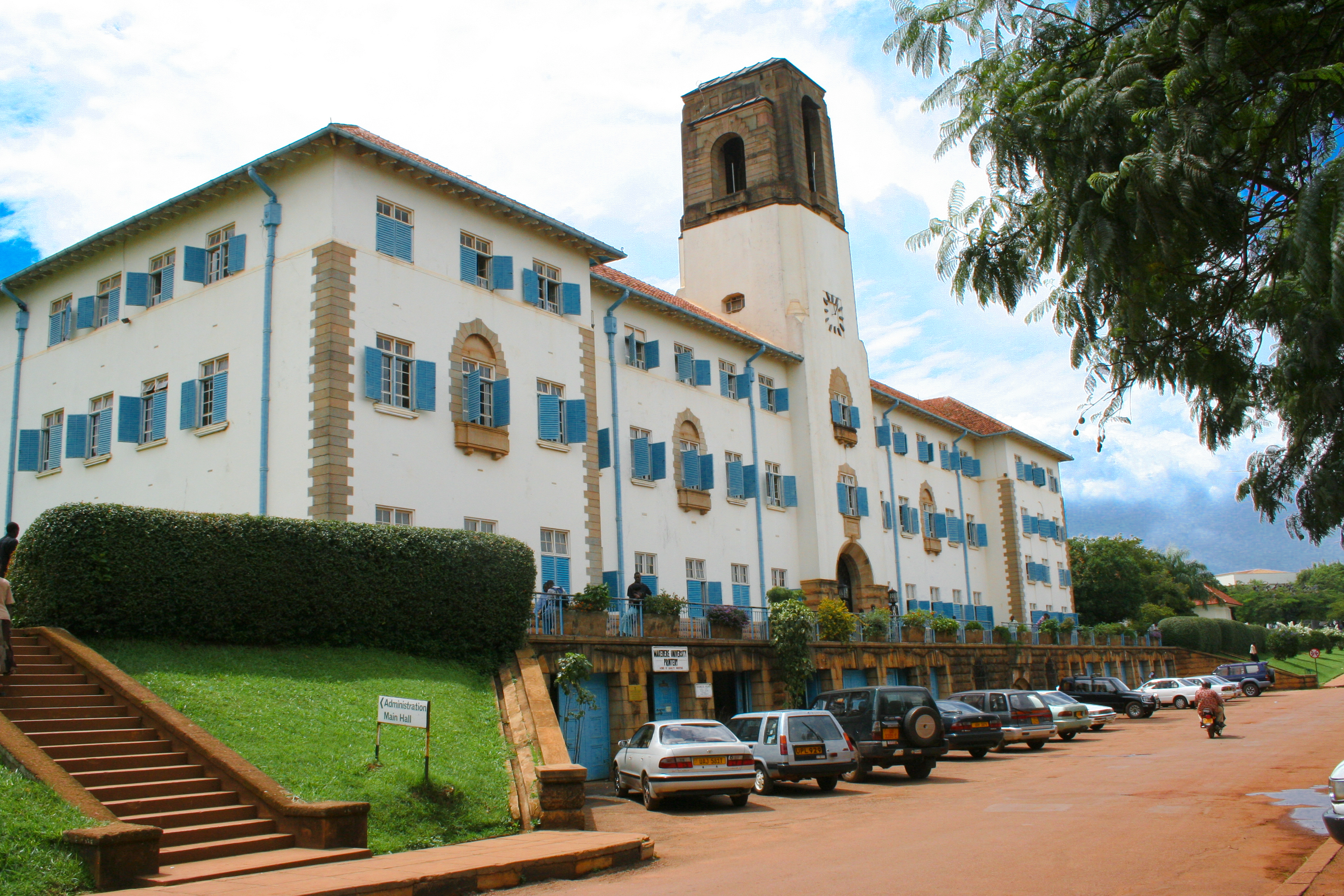
Administration block (Ivory Tower) at Makerere University

The Ivory Tower Building was also called the Ivory Tower or the Makerere University Ivory Tower is the main administrative building at Makerere University in Kampala, Uganda. It is among the oldest buildings of the university

== Origins ==
The Ivory Tower construction started in 1930s and ended in 1941 under the leadership of George C. Turner who served as the Principal of Makerere College from 1939 to 1946. The construction of the Ivory Tower building was funded by Colonial Development bourse.

In early 1938, Duke of Gloucester represented His Majesty King George IV to cut the first sod for the construction of the Ivory Tower on 1938 -November.

== Architecture ==
The Ivory Tower is a tall building with distinct white walls and blue-shuttered windows.

The Ivory Tower was constructed using British Architectural style of the 20th century with a T-shape with a bare stone on the extreme top, a large bell housed in four arches and have a large gents of Leicester clock on the entrance. It's a replica of University of London.

== Significance ==
The Ivory Tower houses the Finance and records/registry department which have the students records and the basement has full archive files spanning the whole historical journey of Makerere University.

The Ivory Tower building is the icon for Makerere University and also considered a national pride and heritage. It's among the UNESCO Heritage sites found in Uganda. It is a tourist attraction motivating people to visit the University.

== Fire ==
On 20 September 2020 overnight, fire gutted the Ivory Tower leaving huge cracks on the outer walls, completely burnt off the roof and most windows. Short circuit due to faulty electrical system caused the fire outbreak according to the Criminal Investigation Department and Ministry of Works report.

Fire started from the roof and spread to down floors which had the offices for finance and records department.

== Reconstruction ==
The Ivory Tower was knocked down after 19 months since the fire outbreak incident as a way to allow the reconstruction after carrying out a detailed, conservatory study and documentation. After the demolition, Makerere University reconstructed the iconic Ivory Tower. The reconstruction used modern building methods with reinforced concrete frame unlike the previous block work structure. However, it maintains its outward appearance.

The government of Uganda funded the reconstruction of Ivory Tower with 21 billion UGX, and Excel Company Limited was contracted to do the reconstruction.

Mastercard Foundation contributed $1 million Uganda shillings to the reconstruction of the Ivory Tower.

== See also ==
- Makerere University

8 Makerere University Library

- Barnabas Nawangwe
