= National Book Trust of Uganda =

Umbrella organisation of Book sellers and publishers in Uganda

The National Book Trust of Uganda (NABOTU), founded in 1997, is a non-government organization that brings together associations and institutions within Uganda's book sector to promote authorship, publishing and a culture of reading in Uganda.

== History ==
NABOTU was set up in 1997 to promote authorship, publishing and the development of a culture of reading in Uganda. It was the successor body to the Uganda Publishers and Booksellers Association (UPABA) which had been formed in the early 1990s as a forum for promoting a good policy environment for Uganda's publishing industry. At the time of the formation of NABOTU, Uganda had started to embrace an open and competitive publishing environment following the adoption of the textbook policy in 1998. The textbook policy which allows 5 different titles for every school subject marked the emergence of a local publishing industry in Uganda which hitherto was dominated by multinational publishers. In 2000, NABOTU was one of the founding book councils together with the National Book Development Council of Kenya (NBDCK) and Baraza Ya Maendeleo Vitabu Tanzania (BAMVITA) of the East African Book Development Association (EABDA). Under the EABDA outfit with the support of Sida, Book Aid International and Hivos, NABOTU has been implementing the East Africa Book Development Programme. The goal of the programme is the eradication of poverty through literacy enhancement. The programme has several projects including Children's Reading Tents; support to school library development; rural community library development; annual National Book Week Festivals; skills development for book sector professionals like authors, publishers, booksellers, etc.; literary awards; book donations and advocacy on issues like textbook policy, national book policy, book trade, copyright, right to write and read, etc. NABOTU has recently expanded the programme with the support of the International Federation of Reprographic Rights Organisations (IFRRO) and IDRC to include copyright management and research on new publishing innovations such as flexible copyright licensing.

== Programmes ==
The East African Book Development Programme whose goal is the eradication of poverty through literacy enhancement is currently being implemented in Uganda, Kenya and Tanzania. The programme creatively engages the target groups to embrace a culture of reading through different activities including;

- Children's and Community Reading Tents (CRTs) organized throughout the year in different parts of Uganda by specialized NABOTU members including: National Library of Uganda (NLU), Reading Association of Uganda (RAU), Uganda Library and Information Association (ULIA), Uganda Women Writers Association (FEMRITE), Uganda Children's Writers and Illustrators Association (UCWIA), City Education Department of Kampala City Council and the Literature Fraternity of Uganda (LIFU) . CRTs introduce Ugandan children to the joys of travel, discovery and engagement which children's fiction and other creative writings from sources such as newspapers, magazines etc. offer. Children engage in silent reading, read-aloud marathons, spellings and word identification, storytelling, story writing, painting and book making. Hundreds of locally published children's storybooks are donated to each participating school to enable them establish school libraries with substantial collections of local storybooks. The book donation also includes selections of children's readers on HIV/AIDS. The readers were carefully crafted to reflect different themes such as African culture, tradition and HIV/AIDS, stigma and discrimination etc. to empower children with valuable information and experiences. Authors of such books visit the CRTs to read and lead a discussion based on their book. Teachers from the beneficiary schools are trained in teaching reading methodologies, promoting reading and managing a school library. There is evidence beginning to emerge showing that exposing children to storybooks lays a good foundation for their learning and education. Several schools across the country that have adopted reading programmes have registered improvements in academic performance. The CRT programme has won NABOTU international accolades including in 2007, the IFLA/Guust van Wessemael Literacy Prize .
- National Book Week Festival organized by NABOTU is a literary celebration of books and reading and their contribution to the development of Uganda culturally, socially, economically and politically which is celebrated once every year throughout Uganda. Several activities are held during the book week to rally support for the important role that writing of books and reading play in developing an individual Ugandan's potential and that of the entire country. The book week helps to dispel the notion that Ugandans have a poor reading culture by drawing on a very rich programme countrywide to attract or encourage them to become readers for life. Activities include: the Book Sector Forum organized by the East African School of Library and Information Science , Makerere University which is an annual conference for the different actors in Uganda's publishing industry with a view to generate ideas for changing the environment of book trade within Uganda and across the borders; the Kampala Book Fair organized by the Uganda Publishers Association (UPA) in close collaboration with the Uganda Booksellers Association (UBA) which is an annual trade fair of books and other reading materials and services related to the publishing industry; the Schools Book Week programme which is a series of activities including read-aloud marathons, storytelling, book discussions, debates on a book related theme etc. organized by the over 15,000 primary schools across Uganda in collaboration with the Ministry of Education and Sports. The schools book week programme draws in 7.4 million school children and their teachers to celebrate the book week. Other book week activities include: the Author reading organized by the Uganda Women Writers Association (FEMRITE) which brings together some of Uganda's leading creative writers to discuss their works with the public made up of writers, literary critics, academics, book reviewers, publishers, librarians and book enthusiasts; the NABOTU Literary Awards organized by the Literature Fraternity of Uganda (LIFU) which is an annual prize for both published and unpublished writers recognizing their excellence in creative writing and providing a motivation for more creativity; Library activities organized by the National Library of Uganda (NLU) in over 40 rural and public libraries across Uganda showcasing their collections, services, public readings and book discussions and; a Poetry night showcasing recitals and stage performances of some of Uganda's best poetry.
- Advocacy and Policy Development a programme under which NABOTU and its members engage policy makers and implementers to resolve any outstanding issues that may be hampering the development of writing, publishing and reading in Uganda. Some of the issues that form NABOTU's current advocacy agenda include: textbook policy, national book policy, textbook procurement systems and book distribution, library development and funding, funding models for school textbooks and supplementary readers, curriculum reviews, trade and taxation issues as they affect book trade, basic freedoms to write and publish etc. The existence of NABOTU has been instrumental in safeguarding key policies that form a foundation for Uganda's book industry such as the textbook policy. The decentralized instruction materials procurement programme (DIMP) which was at the beginning of 2009 replaced with the Hybrid book procurement guidelines with ongoing discussions on the inclusion of booksellers.
- Training of book sector professionals a programme that provides the learning of crucial skills required for improving both products and services offered by the book industry. NABOTU offers training opportunities for authors, illustrators, graphic designers, publishers, booksellers, librarians, teachers etc.

== Copyright and publishing innovations ==
The programme seeks to broaden understanding of copyright law by authors, publishers, legal advisors and all rightsholders and users.

Following the enactment of the Uganda Copyright and Neighbouring Rights Act 2006, there has been increasing pressure from copyright holders to put in place systems that facilitate enforcement. NABOTU is supporting the establishment of the Uganda Reproduction Rights Organisation (URRO) as a collective management organization for its rightsholders. If established, URRO will follow the successful path in rights management and enforcement already set by the Uganda Performing Rights Society (UPRS) in the music industry.

NABOTU is involved in researching the adoption of open access publishing by commercial publishers, research institutes and NGOs as a means of improving access to learning materials in Uganda. This is under the Publishing and Alternative Licensing Models for Africa (PALM Africa) project funded by IDRC currently being implemented in Uganda and South Africa. A publishing experiment involving two commercial publishers i.e. Fountain Publishers Ltd and Mastermind Ltd and; an NGO the Uganda Women Writers Association (FEMRITE) is experimenting with web based published books issued under a creative commons license exploring usage as per the number of downloads and quotations, orders for physical copies of the books and new business models adopted .

== Members of NABOTU ==
- Uganda Publishers Association (UPA)
- Uganda Booksellers Association (UBA)
- Uganda Library and Information Association (ULIA)
- Reading Association of Uganda (RAU)
- Uganda Women Writers Association (FEMRITE)
- Uganda Children's Writers and Illustrators Association (UCWIA)
- Literature Fraternity of Uganda (LIFU)
- National Library of Uganda (NLU)
- Uganda Printers Association (UPA)
- Uganda Community Libraries Association (UgCLA)
- City Education Department of Kampala City Council
- PEN Uganda
- East African School of Library and Information Science (EASLIS), Makerere University
- Uganda Writers Association (UWA)

== See also ==
National Book Development Council of Kenya

East African Book Development Association
