= Mike Wooldridge =

Mike or Michael Wooldridge may refer to:

- Michael Wooldridge (politician) (born 1956), Australian doctor and politician
- Mike Wooldridge (broadcaster), British journalist; world affairs correspondent for BBC News
- Michael Wooldridge (computer scientist) (born 1966), professor at the University of Oxford
