= Kitengesa Community Library =

Community library in Uganda

- 0.3991817567987058°S 31.74942911254487°E
- Location: Kitengesa, Buwuunga sub-county, Masaka District, Uganda
- Established: 1999
- Branches: 1

Collection
- Size: 4,400 books (as of July 2018)

Access and use
- Population served: small rural community, 723 members (as of January 2018)

Other information
- Director: Daniel Ahimbisibwe
- Funding: United Nations One Percent For Development Fund, Kitengesa Comprehensive Secondary School, Friends of Kitengesa Community Library
- Website: www.kitengesalibrary.org

Kitengesa Community Library is a small and successful library in central Uganda. It is part of the Uganda Community Libraries Association and the Friends of African Village Libraries. It received international attention in October 2010 when BBC correspondent Mike Wooldridge did a special report on it for BBC News.

== History ==
Starting in April 1999 with a box of books and 13 students, the Kitengesa Community Library has evolved into an innovative learning center serving 250 students and their extended families. It was started by Emmanuel Mawanda and Dr. Kate Parry. Mawanda is the library director and headmaster of Kitengesa Comprehensive Secondary School. Parry divides her time between New York City, where she is a professor of English at Hunter College, and Uganda, where she has lived for many years.

== Library vision ==
It is a gathering place for knowledge enrichment for the local community and serves as a window to the world via Internet technologies. Reading readiness and reading skills are offered as supplements to primary and secondary schools, as well as literacy programs for adults.

Since the late 1980s, Uganda has rebounded from the abyss of civil war and economic catastrophe to become relatively peaceful, stable, and prosperous. The people of Kitengesa will contribute to Uganda's future and Africa's imprint on the rest of the world.

== Library patrons ==
The people who use the library most are students and teachers in Kitengesa Secondary Comprehensive School, but increasingly, primary and pre-school children are also using the library. Local residents use it regularly, too. The library serves all in the community — from those who are able to read, to the newly literate, to those who want to learn to read and write.

== Funding ==
Until 2007, there were three major funding sources, including United Nations One Percent For Development Fund, Kitengesa Comprehensive Secondary School, and Friends of Kitengesa Community Library. Since 2007, in addition to these major sources, several organizations have made significant contributions, including YouLead, FADA (Forestry for African Development Association), and TEAA (Teachers for East Africa Alumni).

== Research ==
The Kitengesa Community Library has been the site of international research efforts since 2004. Researchers have studied its impact on the surrounding community. Articles and book chapters detailing these research efforts have been published widely. Research topics have included the impact of the library on local economic development; the relationship of language, literacy, cultural practices and the role of the library; the impact of the library on student scholastic achievement; the impact of the library on children's learning readiness; the impact of the library on teaching and teacher outcomes; and the impact of the library on girls and women. A short documentary, on Kitengesa details a recent research project on children's learning readiness skills and the relation to the library.

A few of the published articles are listed below:

- Goodman, G., and Dent, V. (2017). Studying the Effectiveness of a Storytelling/Story-Acting Activity on Ugandan Preschoolers' Theory of Mind and Emergent Literacy in Two Rural Ugandan Community Libraries. In Steen, R.L. (eds.), "Emerging Research in Play Therapy, Child Counseling and Consultation". Hershey, PA: IGI Global.
- Dent, V.; Goodman, G. (2015). "The Rural Library's Role in Ugandan Secondary Students' Reading Habits". The International Federation of Library Associations and Institutions Journal. 41 (1): 53–62. doi:10.1177/0340035215571114. S2CID 110526329.
- Dent, V (2013). "A Qualitative Study of the Academic, Social, and Cultural Factors that Influence Students' Library Use in a Rural Ugandan Village". The International Information & Library Review. 45 (1–2): 37–49. doi:10.1016/j.iilr.2013.05.001.
- Dent, V. 2013. "Exploring secondary school student factors and academic outcomes at the Kitengesa Community Library." In Dent, Goodman, & Kevane, Rural Community Libraries in Africa: Challenges and Impacts. IGI Global, 2014.
- Dent, V. 2012. An Exploratory Study of the Impact of the Rural Ugandan Village Library and Other Factors on the Academic Achievement of Secondary School Students. Unpublished doctoral dissertation, Long Island University.
- Dent, V. 2007. Local Economic Development in Uganda and the Connection to Rural Community Libraries and Literacy. New Library World 108 (5/6): 203–217.
- Dent, V. 2006. Modelling the Rural Community Library: Characteristics of the Kitengesa Library in Uganda. New Library World, 107 (1/2): 16–30.
- Dent, V. 2006. Observations of School Library Impact at Two Rural Ugandan Schools. New Library World, 107 (9/10): 403–421.
- Dent, V., and Goodman, G. 2013. The Beast Had to Marry Balinda: Using Story Examples to Explore Socializing Concepts in Ugandan Caregivers' Oral Stories. "Oral Tradition"
- Dent, V.; Yannotta, L. (2005). "A Rural Community Library in Uganda: A Study of its Use and Users". Libri. 55 (1): 39–55. doi:10.1515/libr.2005.39. S2CID 144941525.
- Goodman, G. 2013. "The Intergenerational Impact of a Rural Community Library on Young Children's Learning Readiness in a Ugandan Village." In Dent, Goodman, & Kevane, Rural Community Libraries in Africa: Challenges and Impacts. IGI Global, 2014.
- Jones, S (2009). "The Community Library as Site of Education and Empowerment for Women: Insights from Rural Uganda". Libri. 59 (2): 124–133. doi:10.1515/libr.2009.012. hdl:10613/5127. S2CID 145103863.
- Parry, K. 2013. "Books for African Readers: Borrowing Patterns at Kitengesa Community Library." In Dent, Goodman, & Kevane, Rural Community Libraries in Africa: Challenges and Impacts. IGI Global, forthcoming.
- Parry, K (2011). "Libraries in Uganda: Not just linguistic imperialism". Libri: International Journal of Libraries and Information Services. 61 (4): 328–337. doi:10.1515/libr.2011.027.
- Parry, K., Kirabo, E. and Nakyato, G. (forthcoming). "Working with parents to promote children's literacy: a family literacy project in Uganda," in Multilingualism and Education. Global Practices and Challenges, ed. Martin C. Njoroge, et al. New York: Springer.
- Parry, K. 2009. Languages, literacies, and libraries: A view from Africa. In J.A. Kleifgen and G.C. Bond (eds.) The languages of Africa and the Diaspora: Educating for Language Awareness. Clevedon: Multilingual Matters.
- Parry, K (2009). "The story of a library in Uganda: Research and development in an African village". Teachers College Record. 111 (9): 2127–2147. doi:10.1177/016146810911100907. S2CID 142334258.
- Parry, K. 2008. "It takes a village -- and a library: Developing a reading culture in Uganda." Edutopia Magazine Online
- Parry, K. 2007. "A library for learning: experiences of students in Uganda." Presented at ELITS Conference Shepstone, South Africa, August 9, 2007.
- Parry, K. 2004. Opportunities for girls: A community library project in Uganda. In B. Norton and A. Pavlenko (eds.) Gender and English language learners. Alexandria, VA: TESOL.
- Parry, K (2003). "The third Pan African Conference on Reading for All". TESOL Quarterly. 37 (4): 739–48. doi:10.2307/3588222. JSTOR 3588222.
- Parry, K (2002). "Literacy for development? A community library project in Uganda". Language Matters. 33 (1): 142–68. doi:10.1080/10228190208566182. S2CID 143039278.

The research has and continues to influence the development of the library and library-related services in the village. For example, findings from an unpublished research study (Jones 2008) on secondary schooling for girls led to the creation of the AFRIPads Project. The study revealed that girls were missing school each month due to the lack of proper feminine hygiene products.

Additional related research includes the following:

- Jones, S. 2008. Secondary schooling for girls in rural Uganda: challenges, opportunities and emerging identities. Unpublished doctoral dissertation, University of British Columbia.
- Jones, S (2011). "Girls' secondary education in Uganda: Assessing policy within the women's empowerment framework". Gender and Education. 23 (4): 385–413. doi:10.1080/09540253.2010.499854. S2CID 145160481.
- Jones, S.; Norton, B. (2007). "On the Limits of Sexual Health Literacy: Insights From Ugandan Schoolgirls". Diaspora, Indigenos, and Minority Education. 1 (4): 285–305. doi:10.1080/15595690701563998. S2CID 144117436.
- Kendrick, M.; Jones, S. (2008). "Girls' visual representations of literacy in a rural Ugandan community". Canadian Journal of Education. 31 (2): 371–404.
- Norton, B.; Jones, S.; Ahimbisibwe, D. (2011). "Learning about HIV/AIDS in Uganda: Digital resources and language learner identities". The Canadian Modern Language Review. 67 (4): 569–90. doi:10.3138/cmlr.67.4.568. S2CID 144253365.
- Stranger-Johannessen, E. (2009). Student learning through a rural community library: A case study from Uganda (Master's thesis). University of Oslo, Norway. Retrieved from https://www.duo.uio.no/bitstream/handle/123456789/31163/Espen_StrangerJohannessen.pdf?sequence=1
- Stranger-Johannessen, E. (2014). Promoting a reading culture through a rural community library in Uganda. IFLA Journal, 40(2), 92–101. doi:10.1177/0340035214529732
- Stranger-Johannessen, E. (2014). Trends and developments in the literature on community libraries in Africa. Libri, 64(4), 396–407.
- Stranger-Johannessen, E., Asselin, M., & Doiron, R. (2015). New perspectives on community library development in Africa. New Library World, 116(1-2), 79–93. doi:10.1108/NLW05-2014-0063
- Yellin, E. (2015). An Exploration of Caregiver Grief, Depression, and Outcomes Associated with Child Mortality in Rural Uganda. Unpublished Ph.D. dissertation, Long Island University, Clinical Psychology Doctoral Program, Brookville, New York.
- Fanciuollo, Michelle (2017). "A Mediational Model of the Impact of Caregiver Depression, Social Support, and Physical Health on Ugandan Preschool Children's Mental State Talk: The Role of Attachment Security." Unpublished Ph.D. dissertation, Long Island University, Clinical Psychology Doctoral Program, Brookville, New York.

== Videos ==
There are a number of videos that provide a visual tour of the library and the community:

- A UN story on the Kitengesa Community Library as an "incubator for development" https://news.un.org/en/audio/2018/02/1003641
- BBC story on the Kitengesa Community Library (2010).
- A brief documentary on the use of the library by women from the community.
- A brief documentary on the reading and literacy research project at the Kitengesa Community Library.
- Opening ceremony of the new Kitengesa Community Library building, 2009.
- VIdeo montage from Kitengesa Community Library.
- A Visit to the Uganda Community Libraries Association and Kitengesa Community Library.

== Grants and awards ==
In 2013, an EIFL-PLIP (Electronic Information for Libraries – Public Libraries Innovation Programmes) Award was given for library services that contribute to social inclusion in the community. The project for which the library won the prize is the work that it is doing with students at the nearby Good Samaritan School for the Deaf. Volunteers Nidhi Abraham and Ooi Koon Peng from the University of British Columbia initiated the project with the help of Nakasiita Rosemary, one of the Library Scholars. The students now come regularly to the library to read books, learn how to use the computers, and to teach hearing people in the library's Sign Language Club; they also talk to Nidhi and Koon Peng every week by Skype.
