= Makerere University Library =

Oldest academic library in Uganda

Makerere University Library (MULIB)
- Renovated entrance to Main Library
- 0.3348°N 32.5653°E
- Location: Kampala, Makerere Hill, Uganda
- Type: Academic
- Established: 1949 (77 years ago)
- Branch of: Main Library
- Branches: 15

Collection
- Items collected: Books, journals, periodicals, maps, atlases, photographs, sound recordings, microfiches
- Size: 450,000
- Legal deposit: yes

Access and use
- Population served: University of Makerere students, faculty and staff

Other information
- Director: Dr. Helen M. Byamugisha
- Website: Library Homepage

Makerere University Library, established in 1949, is the oldest academic library in Uganda. In addition to its primary role as an academic library, it also serves as the national reference library and the legal depository of all works published in Uganda. It has been a depository for the United Nations since 1956.

Along with the main library, there are seven specialized branch libraries. Today Makerere University is composed of nine colleges. On-campus libraries include the College of Business and Management Studies, College of Education and External Studies, College of Engineering, Design, Art and Technology; College of Humanities and Social Sciences; College of Natural Sciences; and College of Veterinary Medicine, Animal Resources and Bio-Security. The College of Agriculture and Environmental Sciences at Kabanyolo and College of Health Sciences at Albert Cook Medical Library at Mulago have libraries located off campus.

The largest library is the main branch, which is 130,000 square feet and contains the majority of the collection. It has undergone numerous renovations and extensions in 1962, 1972 and 2006. The most recent occurred in December 2012, after which the President of the Republic of Uganda officially reopened the library.

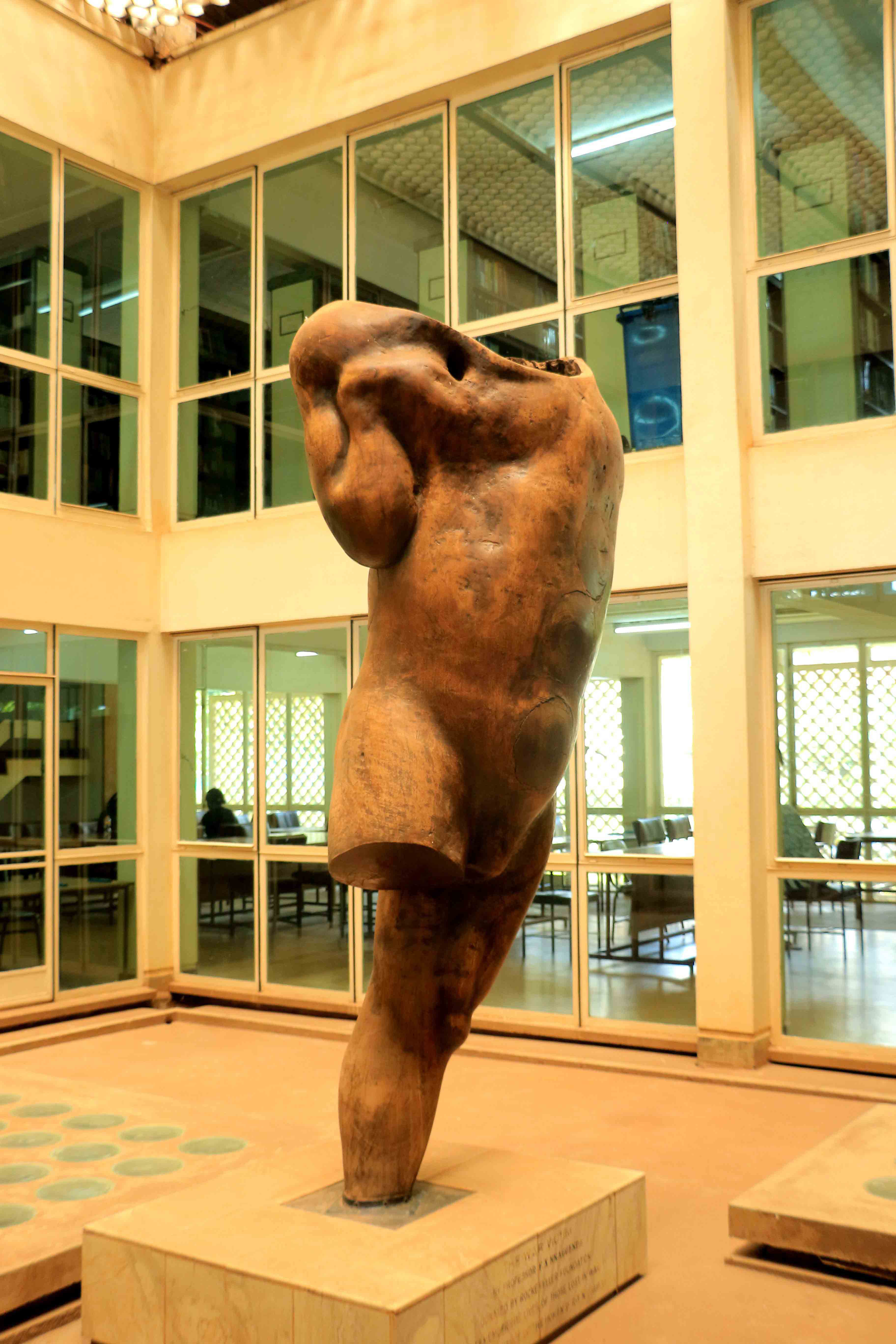
war Victim Sculpture at the Main Library Makerere University.jpg

== Library administration ==
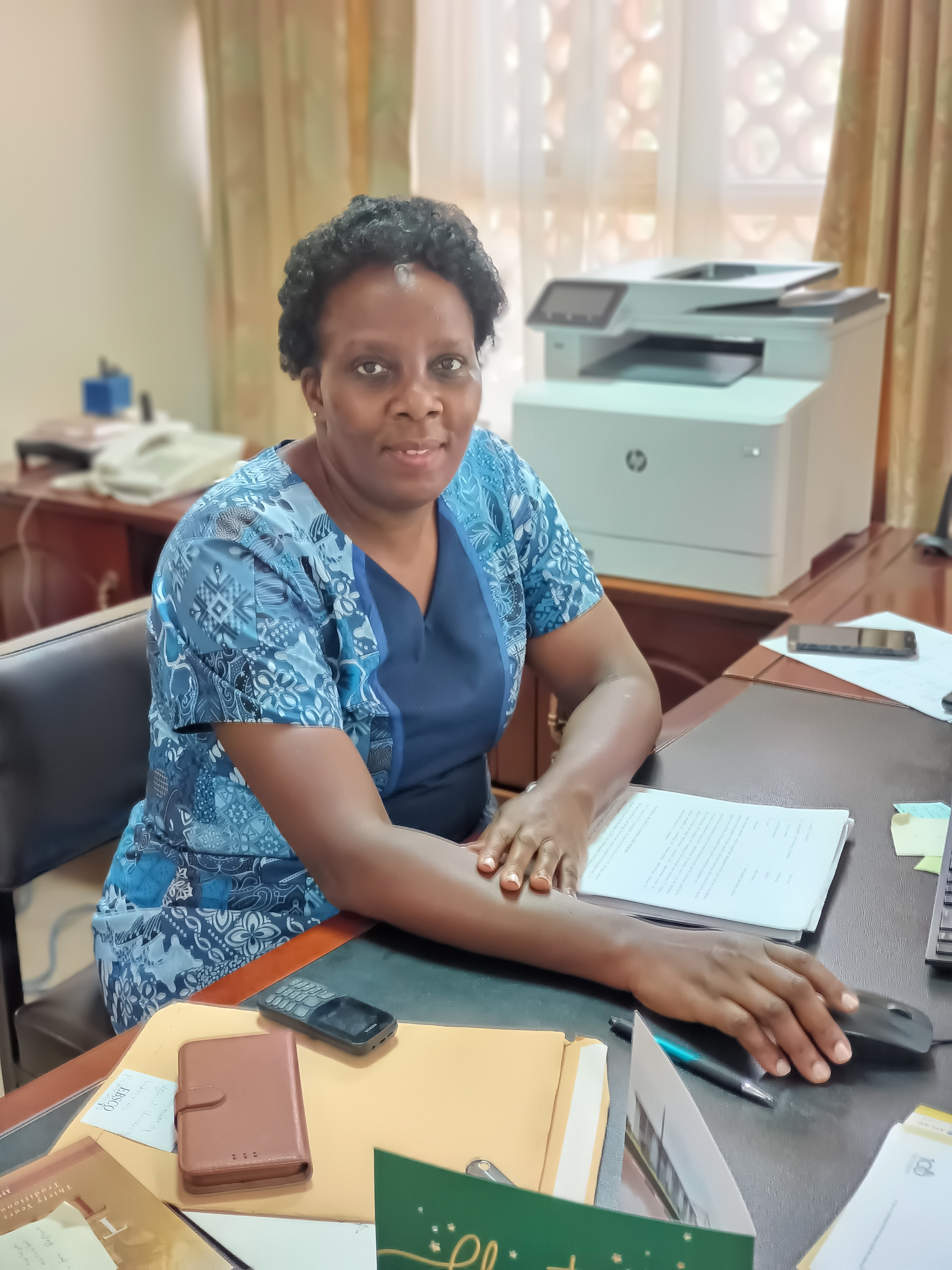
Current University Librarian Makerere University

The University Librarian is the overall head of Makerere University Library Services, which consists of the Main Library and specialized Branch College Libraries. The Office of University Librarian is the director and reports to the Vice-Chancellor of Academic Affairs. Ruth Nalumaga is the University Librarian, Makerere University, effective June 2023. She holds a bachelor’s degree in library and information science (BLIS) from the East African School of Library and Information Science, Makerere University, a master’s degree in Librarianship from Monash University, Australia and PhD in Library and Information Science from the University of Gothenburg and the University College of Boras, Sweden, 2009. She is a Library Associate Professor, academic supervisor and Lecturer. The former director, Professor Maria Musoke, who is the first Ugandan woman to have a PhD in information science. There are ten other program directors, each responsible for a specific area or function of the library. All policy must be approved by University council, the highest tier of decision making at the university. research and staff development, preservation and conservation and staff welfare.

College Libraries

There are Nine (9) College Libraries and 1 School Library with a total area of over 2, 000 square metres. Seven (7) of the College Libraries are situated at the Main Campus, namely: College of Business and Management Sciences; College of Computing and Information Sciences; College of Education and External Studies; College of Engineering, Design, Art and Technology; College of Humanities and Social Sciences; College of Natural Sciences; and College of Veterinary Medicine, Animal Resources and Bio-Security. The rest are located away from the Main Campus and serve College of Agriculture and Environmental Sciences at Kabanyoro and College of Health Sciences at Albert Cook Medical Library at Mulago.

== Library sections ==
=== Africana and Special Collections ===
The Africana and special collection area of the library is located on the fourth floor of the main library. It contains materials related to East Africa, general Africana texts and books and documents on Uganda. This includes papers, reports and publications from individuals, private and official organizations dating ranging from the 19th century to current day. Examples include copies of the first newspapers and photographs from Uganda, church files, UN publications and diaries and journal entries form explorers, travelers, missionaries, military and political figures. Especially notable is the amount of historical documents from the early periods of colonization in East Africa. Considered the primary depository and research center for East African history, it also includes a music and photographic collection of great historic and cultural significance. Theses and dissertations from African universities are also stored in this area along with university archival materials.

=== Book Bank ===
Originating in 1990, the book bank houses copies of textbooks and classroom materials collected from academic departments throughout the university's history. Current textbooks and materials are also held here. It ensures that students have access to textbooks despite limited funds, allows sharing between departments and keeps a record of curricular materials. The collection currently contains 200,000 materials.

=== Law ===
The area dedicated to law contains textbooks on law and human rights in a number of languages and periodicals and law reports from the UK, America, India and Africa. It also houses the Human Rights and Peace Center Collection of humanitarian law materials which focuses on teaching research, teaching and activism. In conjunction with the program of study offered by the University, this is the first human rights center in Sub-Saharan Africa.

=== International Development Agency ===
Named for the International Development Agency which donated the core collection, it includes reference materials and textbooks for undergraduate use. The World Bank continues to play an active role in the contribution of materials.

== ICT and technical facilities ==
Each of the branch libraries contains technology services and facilities. The majority are in the main branch, including computer labs and training units. There is a specialized computer lab for students with disabilities and designated areas software use and digital media. The Research and Learning Commons provide students with support and tutoring with research, writing and mathematics. There is also an online training platform which provides information about upcoming bibliographic and technology instruction courses. According to Elly Amani Gamukama, the systems administrator at the main library, "the university has made it a policy that every first year student must go through a computer course. We are aiming at reaching the international standard which is 1 computer per 50 students. Starting next year, all students will undergo training in the use of the available databases and other library resources that will be compulsory and carrying credit".

== Projects and partnerships ==
=== Carnegie Corporation of New York Funding Support ===
The libraries of Makerere University received a $650K grant in 2001 for the duration of four years. The project goal was to "make significant contribution to equitable improvement of the academic standards of Makerere University, with a priority to science-based and gender disciplines". Specific objectives included the creation of an interlibrary loan program with library partners and other academic libraries, to increase the collection in specific areas, minimize book theft and loss and hire and retrain staff. The implementation of an Electronic Document Delivery Service, Science Citation Index and book safety system resulted from the grant. Approximately 5,000 books relating to the fields of science and gender were added to the collection. Funding also purchased computers and established an information literacy program for students, faculty and staff. The project is ongoing and received an additional $400K grant in 2004 to develop an automation process beginning with the main library.

=== Swedish International Development Cooperation ===
The Department for Research Cooperation at the Swedish International Development Cooperation Agency provided the library with almost $1 million to build ICT structure, create a PHD program for library staff, increase training and purchase subscriptions to electronic journals and licenses. This also created a partnership with a variety of university libraries in Sweden to share practices, training and education.

=== Norwegian Agency for Development Cooperation ===
The Norwegian Agency for Development Cooperation has used a variety of non-governmental organizations to support development in Uganda through the improvement of academic services at the university. The library recently received a $200K grant to support an administrative computing project.

=== Database of African Theses and Dissertation ===
Launched in 2003, the Database of African Theses and Dissertation is part of the Association of African Universities program to manage the collection, organization and dissemination of dissertations and theses. Partially sponsored by the Ford Foundation and Rockefeller Foundation, this is the largest collection of African scholarly work in the world.

== Digitization ==
=== Makerere University Library Information System ===
The library is in the process of digitizing its collection for access through its online public access catalog. This electronic database will replace its print indexes. The project also includes digitizing photographs and scanning archival material to make the rare collection more accessible.

=== Uganda Scholarly Digital Library ===
Makerere University is an institutional repository which collects, organizes and allows retrieval of scholarly articles and books, theses and dissertations, conference proceedings and technical reports in an electronic format. The library uses DSpace technology to work in conjunction with the Open Archives Initiative. All researchers can submit content and copyright is according to either the publishing body or the content owner. The depository contains an approximate 2.000 titles, over 2,382 sound recordings and 1,907 files of print materials. The digital library has undergone various challenges; including copyright issues, inadequate skills, low bandwidth, out of date equipment and inadequate funding.

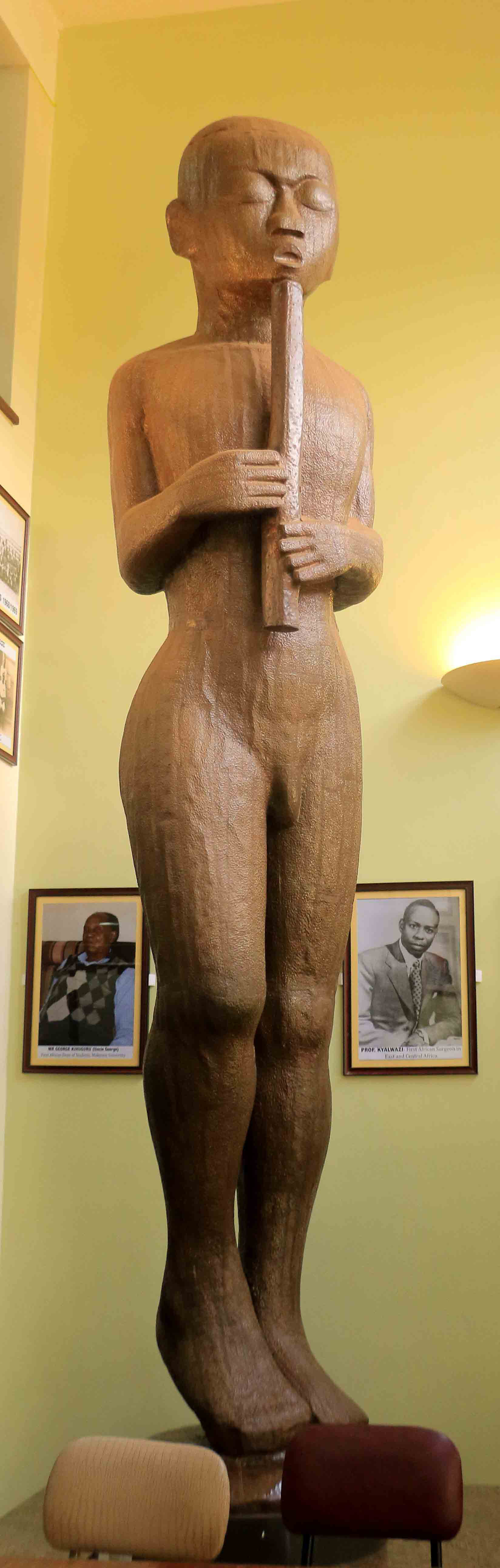
The Flute Boy.jpg

== World Library Day ==
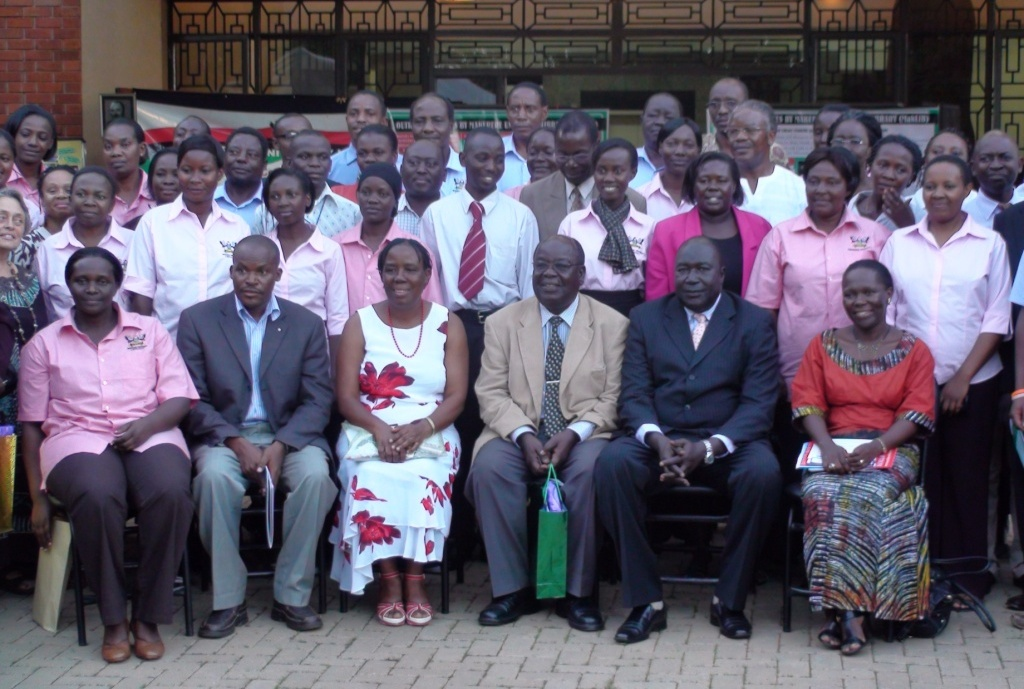
Makerere University Library Day celebrations 2010

The World Library Day has been celebrated internationally in different parts of the World since 1897. In Uganda, the Library Day was first celebrated at Makerere University Library on 22 May 2009. The second Library Day was celebrated on 23 May 2010. Since then, it has become an annual event. The aim of this special day is to draw attention of the policy makers, administrators, Library users and all stakeholders to the role of the Library in the functions of the University and beyond. As an academic library, the theme of Makerere University Library day focuses on Academia because its primary role is to provide access to information resources in support of study, teaching and research.

== See also ==
East African School of Library and Information Science

National Library of Uganda
