= National Library Service of Botswana =

- Ditirelo tsa motlobo wa dibuka tsa Botswana
- 24.6722°S 25.9063°E
- Location: 1272 Lithuli Road, Gaborone, Botswana
- Type: National Library
- Established: April 8, 1968 (58 years ago)

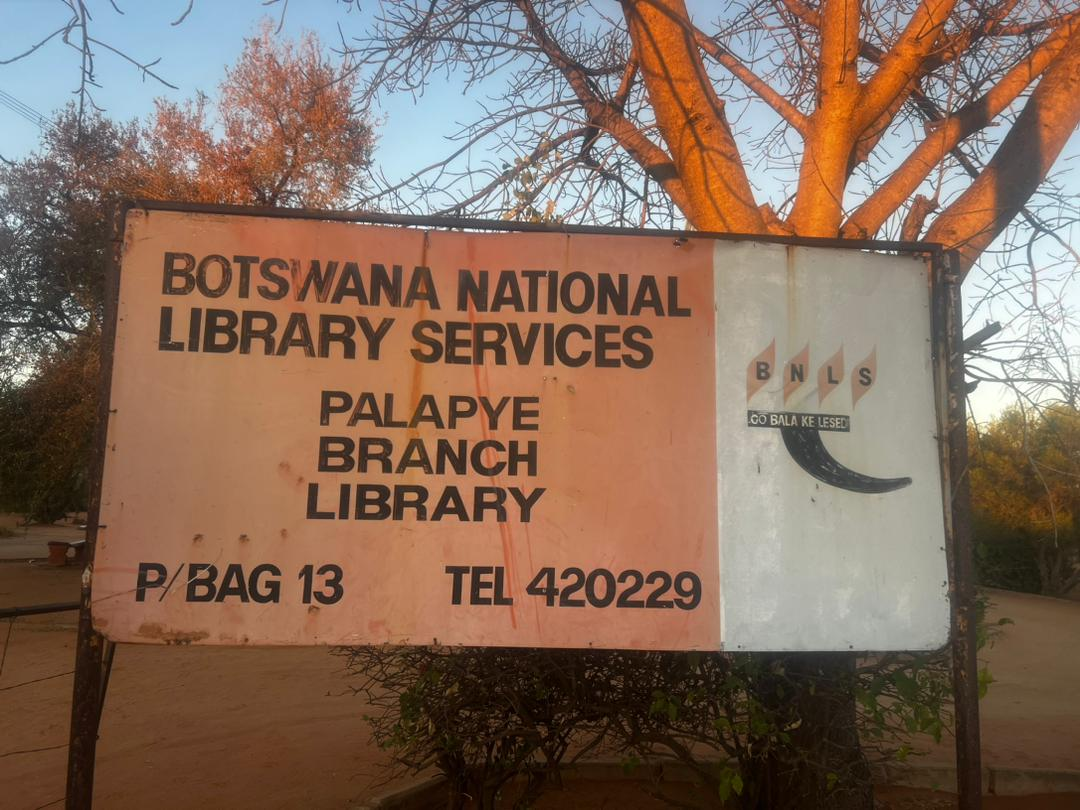
Botswana National Library Services Signboard Palapye

The National Library Service of Botswana (Tswana: Ditirelo tsa motlobo wa dibuka tsa Botswana) is the legal deposit and copyright library for Botswana. It was officially opened on April 8, 1968. They strive to be a world class library and information hub. The library is considered one of the most centralized in the world, as it is responsible for the professional development for all libraries within Botswana, including academic ones.

== History ==
Being established in September 1967 through the Act of the Botswana National Assembly. President Sir Seretse Khama, the first President of the Republic of Botswana, officially opened the service on April 8, 1968. It was one of seven departments of the Ministry of Labour and Home Affairs. Its mission has been to preserve the national literary heritage and to provide the public with informational and educational services.

According to the United Nations, as of 2003 approximately 81 percent of adult Batswana are literate.

== Services ==
The library offers many services including:

- Mobile Library Service
- Postal Service
- Reference Service
- Book Requests Service
- Children's Service
- Computer Training Service
- International Standard Book Number (ISBN)
- Maps

== Divisions ==
The library currently encompasses many divisions including:

- Bibliographic Support Services
- National Reference Library
- Public Libraries Division
- Library Service for People with Disabilities
- Projects Research and Publications

== Programs ==
The library currently offers many programs to its patrons, including:

- Reading Club
- Homework Assistance
- Youth Computer Training
- Braille
- Annes Stine
- Bana Ba Dinonyane
- Motswedi Rehabilitation Center
- Life-Line
- Storytelling
- Art and Craft
- Health Talk
- Sesigo

== See also ==
- List of national and state libraries
- Botswana National Archives and Records Services

== Bibliography ==
- Margaret Baffour-Awuah, Principal Librarian, Gaborone, Botswana: A Day in Her Life
- "Botswana", World Report 2010, The Hague: International Federation of Library Associations, OCLC 225182140, archived from the original on 29 June 2019, "Freedom of access to information" (Includes information about the national library)
