= East African School of Library and Information Science =

School at Makerere University in Uganda

Coordinates: 0.34041860090671555°N 32.56777614275131°E

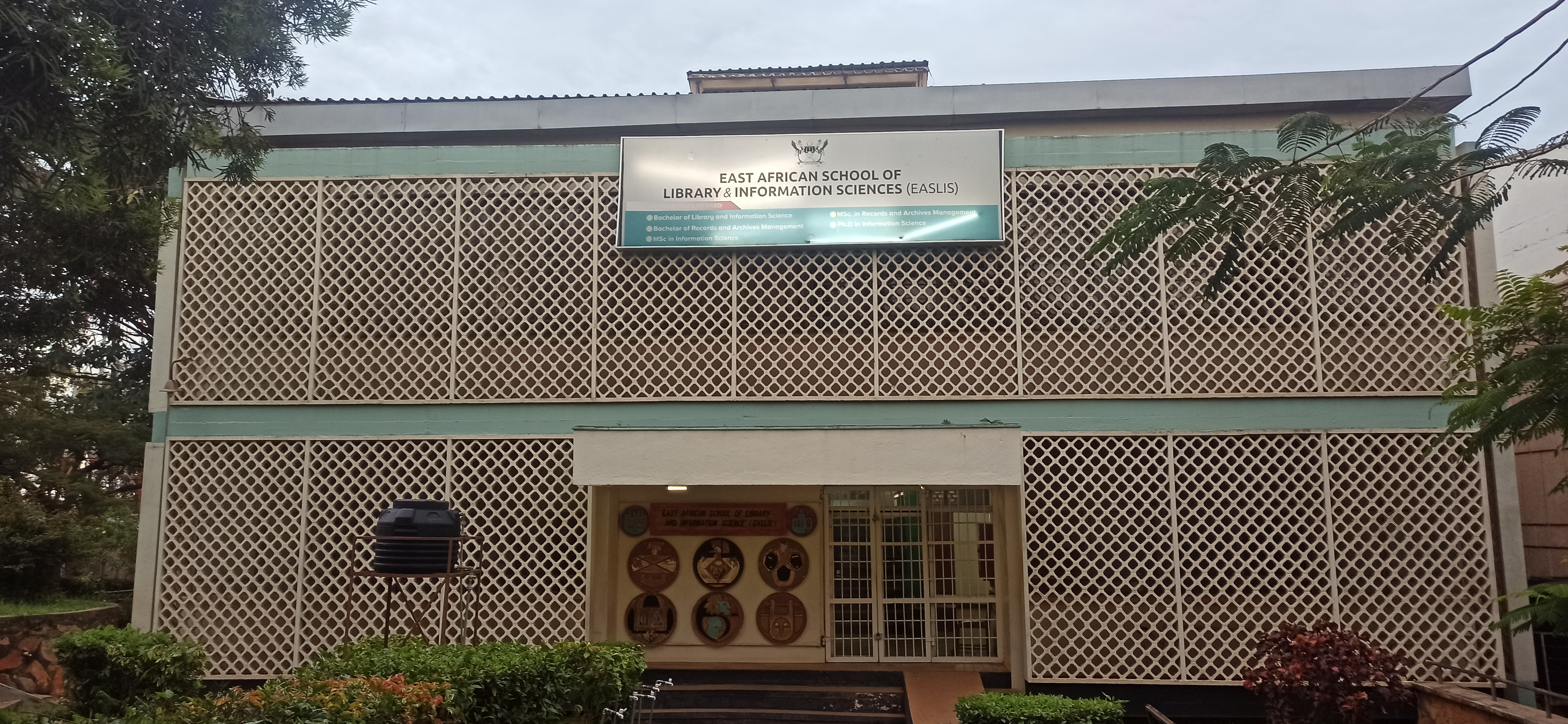
The Building housing the East African school of Library and Information Science at Makerere University Main Campus

The East African School of Library and Information Science, also known as EASLIS, is one of the schools that make up the College of Computing and Information Science (COCIS) at Uganda's largest university, Makerere University in Uganda.

EASLIS is located at Makerere University's main campus in Kampala, just next to Uganda's oldest academic library which is Makerere University's Main Library and it is situated next to the junction that leads to the school of Chemistry and not far from the university's Main Administration Block and the Freedom Square.

== History ==
The school was founded in 1963, shortly after Uganda had gained independence and its establishment was meant to foster the development of library professionals in the East African countries (Uganda, Kenya, and Tanzania). The school was established with funds from United Nations Educational, Scientific and Cultural Organization (UNESCO) and at the time of its establishment called the East African School of Librarianship.

== Programs ==
When the school was established it was only offering a certificate in library studies, but after ten years in 1974 an additional certificate leading to the award of diploma in library science was introduced, a post graduate diploma in library science got introduced in 1975, and then in 1988 the Bachelor of library and information science was introduced. EASLIS offers two Masters programs in information science and in records and archives management that were established in 1997 and 2016 respectively, one PhD in information studies since 2004 and a Doctor of Philosophy in archival studies planned.

EASLIS has had a partnership with the University of Boras in Sweden and the partnership has seen several cohorts of students from EASLIS go to Sweden in a specified student exchange program.

== Leadership ==
The Current Dean of EASLIS is the first female occupant of the office. Past deans include the following:

- Mr. Knud Larsen - First Director of EASLIS (1963–1966)
- Mr. S. Seith - Director (1967–1971)
- Prof. SAH Abidi - (1972–2002)
- Prof. Isaac Milton Namwanje Kigongo –Bukenya (2002–2006)
- Prof. Elisam Magara (2006–2010)
- Prof. Constant Okello-Obura (2010–2014 and 2018–2022)
- Dr. George W. Kiyingi (2013–2018)
- Dr. Sarah Kaddu 2023-

== Notable alumni ==
- Prof. Robert Ikoja-Odongo - Vice Chancellor Soroti University
- Dr. Fredrick Kiwuwa Lugya - University Librarian Busitema University
