= Botswana National Archives and Records Services =

Archive in Botswana

National Archives of Botswana
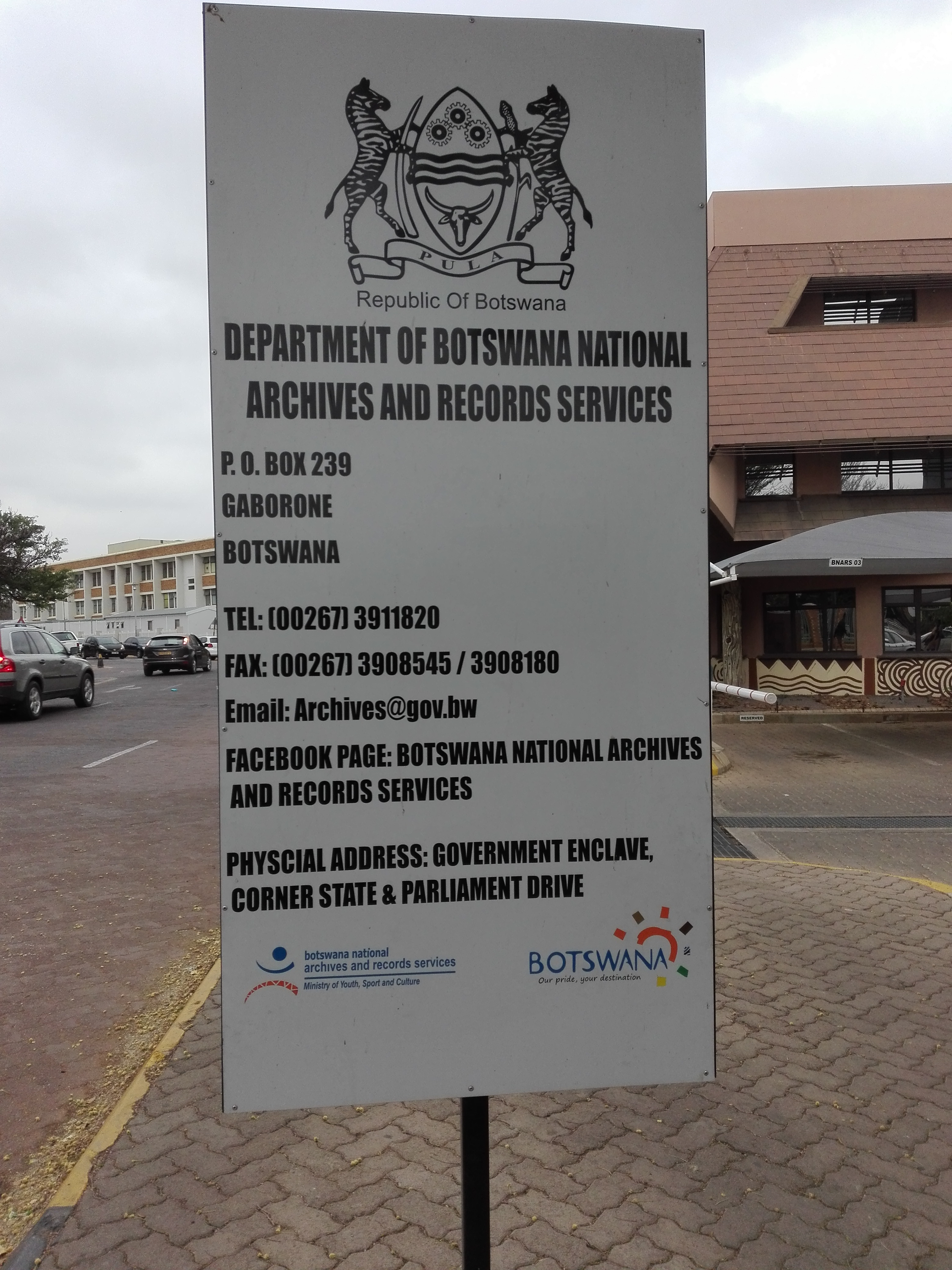
- Botswana Archives and records management centre
- Location: Gaborone, Botswana
- Coordinates: 24.660346278227635°S 25.91010426128248°E
- Type: Archives

The National Archives of Botswana (Tswana: Ntlo ya peeletso ya lefatshe la Botswana) are the national archives of Botswana. They hold 20,000 items and are located in Gaborone.

== Profile ==
The Botswana National archives was established in 1967 as portfolio responsibility of the Ministry of Home Affairs. From that time the Archives operated on Administrative instructions issued by the Ministry until 1978 when Parliament enacted the Archives legislation which formally established the national archives of Botswana for the preservation of public Archives. The 1985 organisation and methods review of the Ministry of Labour and Home Affairs led to a revolutionary development in Botswana’s Records Management establishment. The Permanent Secretary to the President Circular No.4 of 1993 established BNARS as a department and gave it the mandate to provide a Records Management service to Government. It is located in the Parliament buildings in the City Center of Gaborone.

== Functions of the Department ==
The main function of the Department is to provide records and information management service to government agencies; and to collect, preserve and access the nation’s documentary heritage. The National Archives Act provides that records which are 20 years and above be open for public access.

== Gallery ==
Below is a gallery of photos.

gallery of photos

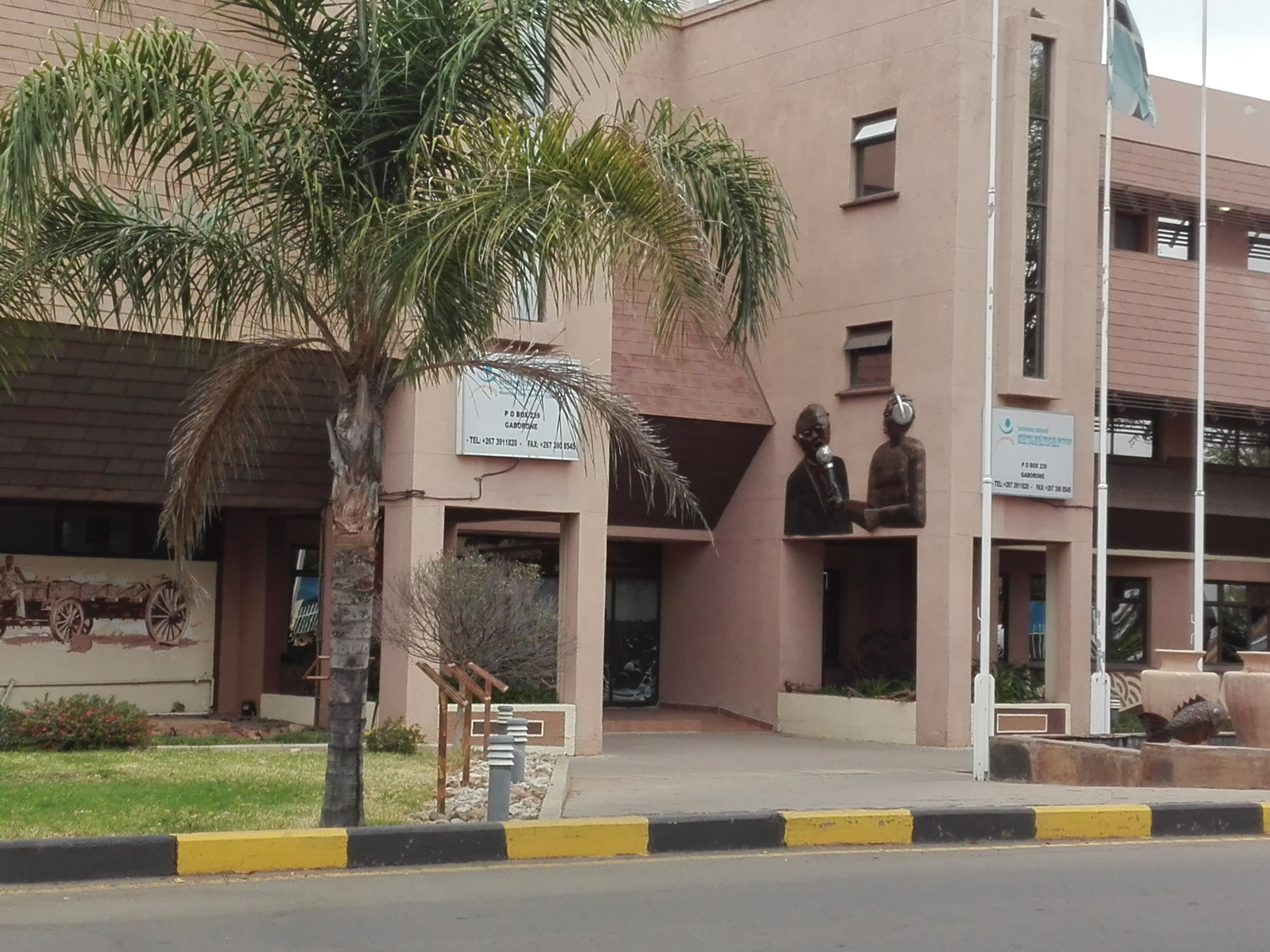
Archives_and_Records_management_center_Botswana

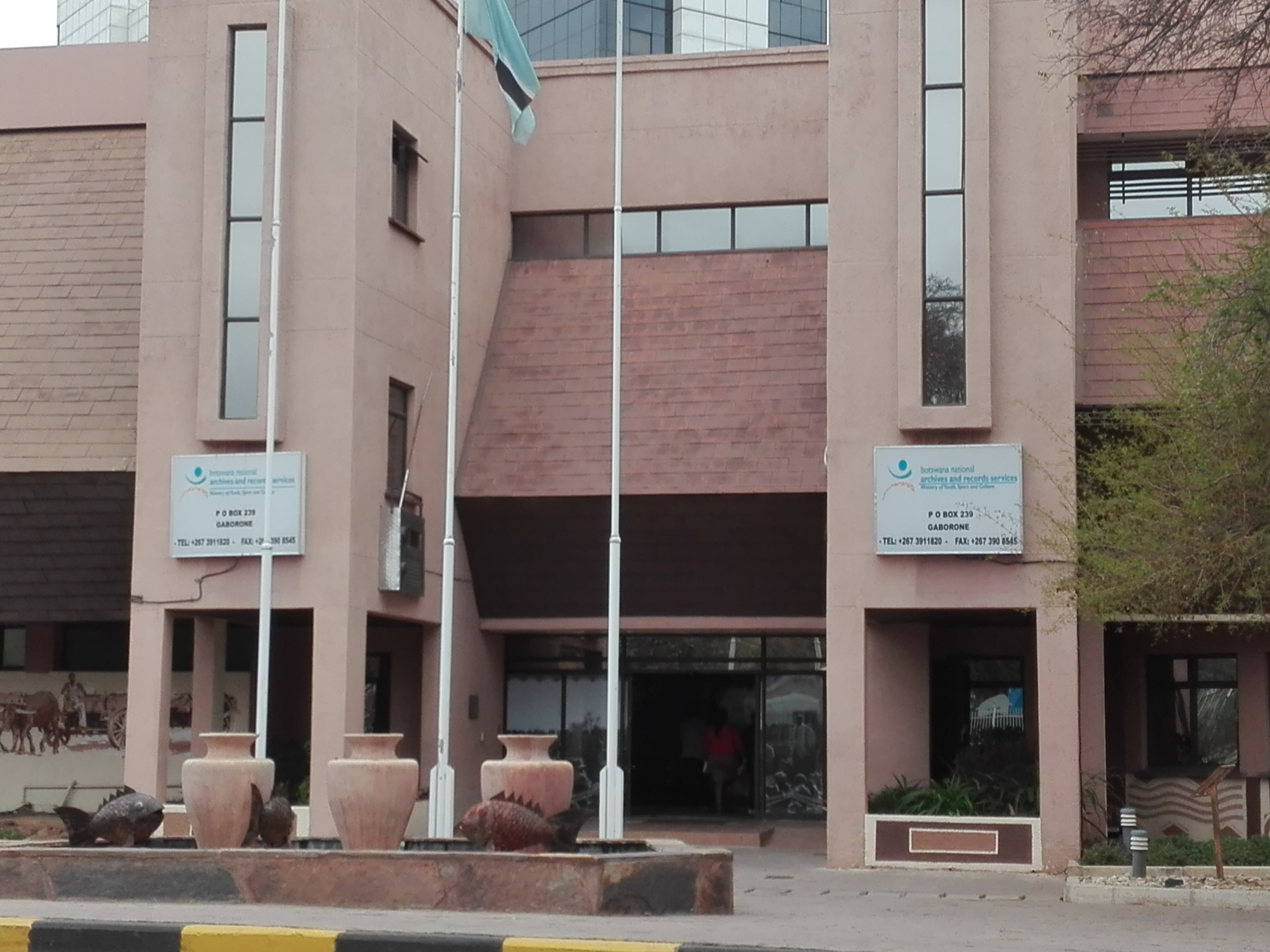
Archives and Records management center Botswana (Front View)

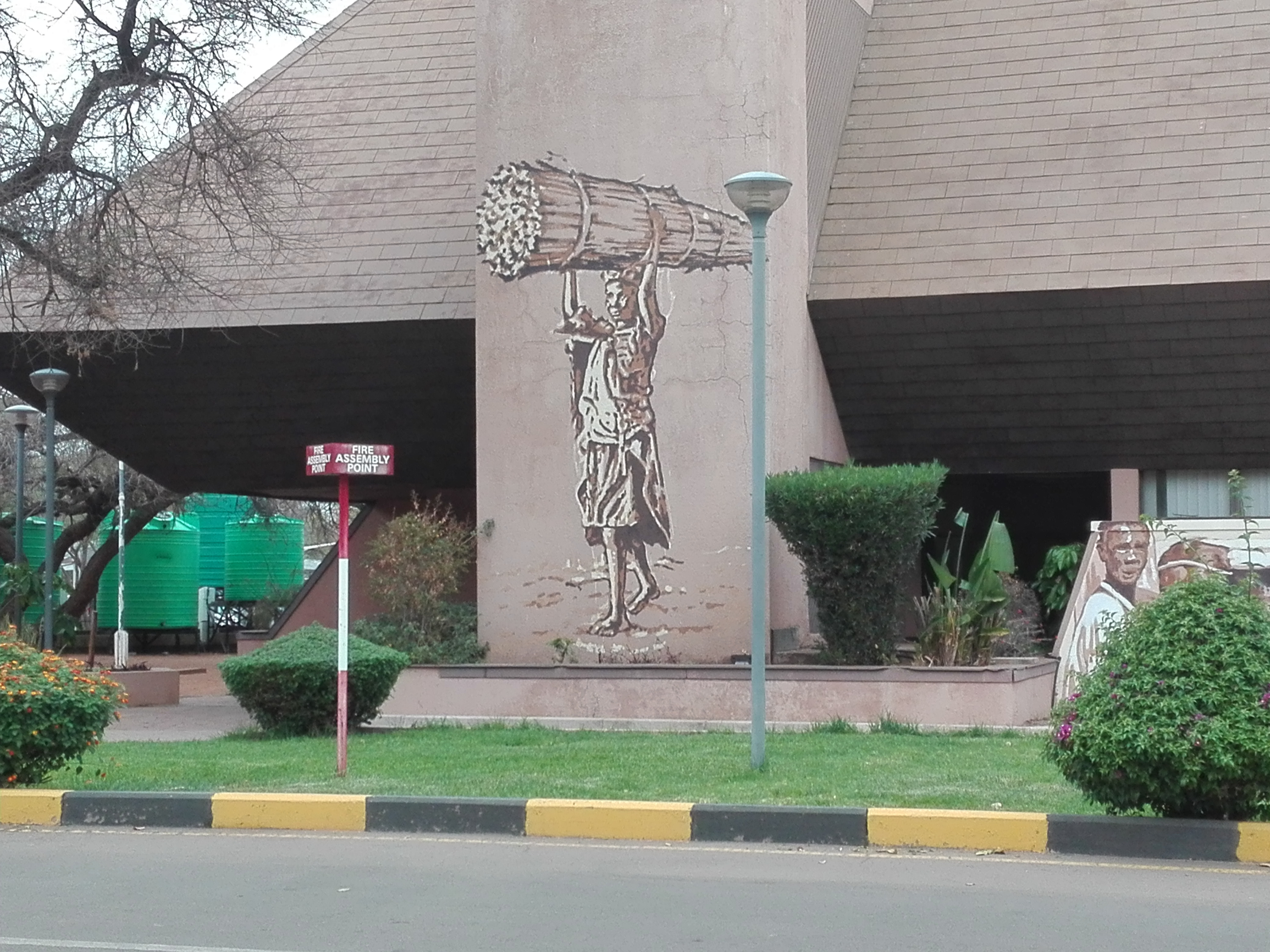

== See also ==
- National Library Service of Botswana
- List of national archives
