= Bachelor of Library Science =

The bachelor of library science (or "bachelor of library and information science") is a degree sometimes awarded to students majoring in library science. It is commonly abbreviated as "B.L.S.", "B.Lib.", or "B.L.I.S.", often with the periods omitted ("BLS", "BLib", or "BLIS"). It has gone out of favor in the United States due to an ALA accredited M.L.S. degree becoming required in most public libraries and academic libraries for employment at the librarian level. Most colleges that still offer B.L.S. programs are specifically focused on training recipients to work in a school library, as requirements are not always as stringent if the proper teacher certification is attained.

== Indian system ==
As per the Indian education system, a Bachelor of Library Science degree is awarded after one year of study, divided into two semesters. The number of semesters may vary between institutions. The award can be abbreviated to B.Lib., B.Lib.Sc. or B.L.I.Sc (for 'Bachelor of Library and Information Science.').

=== Eligibility ===
Applicants holding a bachelors in any stream from a recognised university or college are eligible to apply for the B.Lib. program.
