= Mike Wooldridge (broadcaster) =

BBC journalist

Mike Wooldridge OBE is a world affairs correspondent for the BBC News. Wooldridge spent his youth at Bournemouth School before joining BBC News in April 1970 as a sub-editor. He became a news reporter in 1978, and in 1982 he became the East Africa correspondent. In 1989, he moved to Johannesburg to become the BBC's South Africa correspondent. Less than two years later in 1990, he became Religious Affairs correspondent, reporting on the influence of religion in modern societies, focusing on conflict arising from religion. In 1996, he moved to Delhi to become the South Asia correspondent. In 2001 Wooldridge became a world affairs correspondent for the BBC News.

During his time at the BBC, Wooldridge has covered many historic events, including:

- 1972, United Nations General Assembly
- 1975, General Franco's death.
- 1978, Earthquake in Tabas, Iran, in which more than 20,000 died.
- 1980's, African civil wars in refugee crises in Sudan, Somalia, Angola and Mozambique.
- 1985, Drought in Ethiopia
- 1990, release from prison of Nelson Mandela.
- 1997, 50th Anniversary of Independence between India and Pakistan.
- 1999, Kargil District conflict in India's Kashmir region.

In the Queen's 2002 Birthday Honours he received an OBE for "services to broadcasting in developing countries".
