= National Library of Uganda =

Coordinates: 0.3228°N 32.5747°E

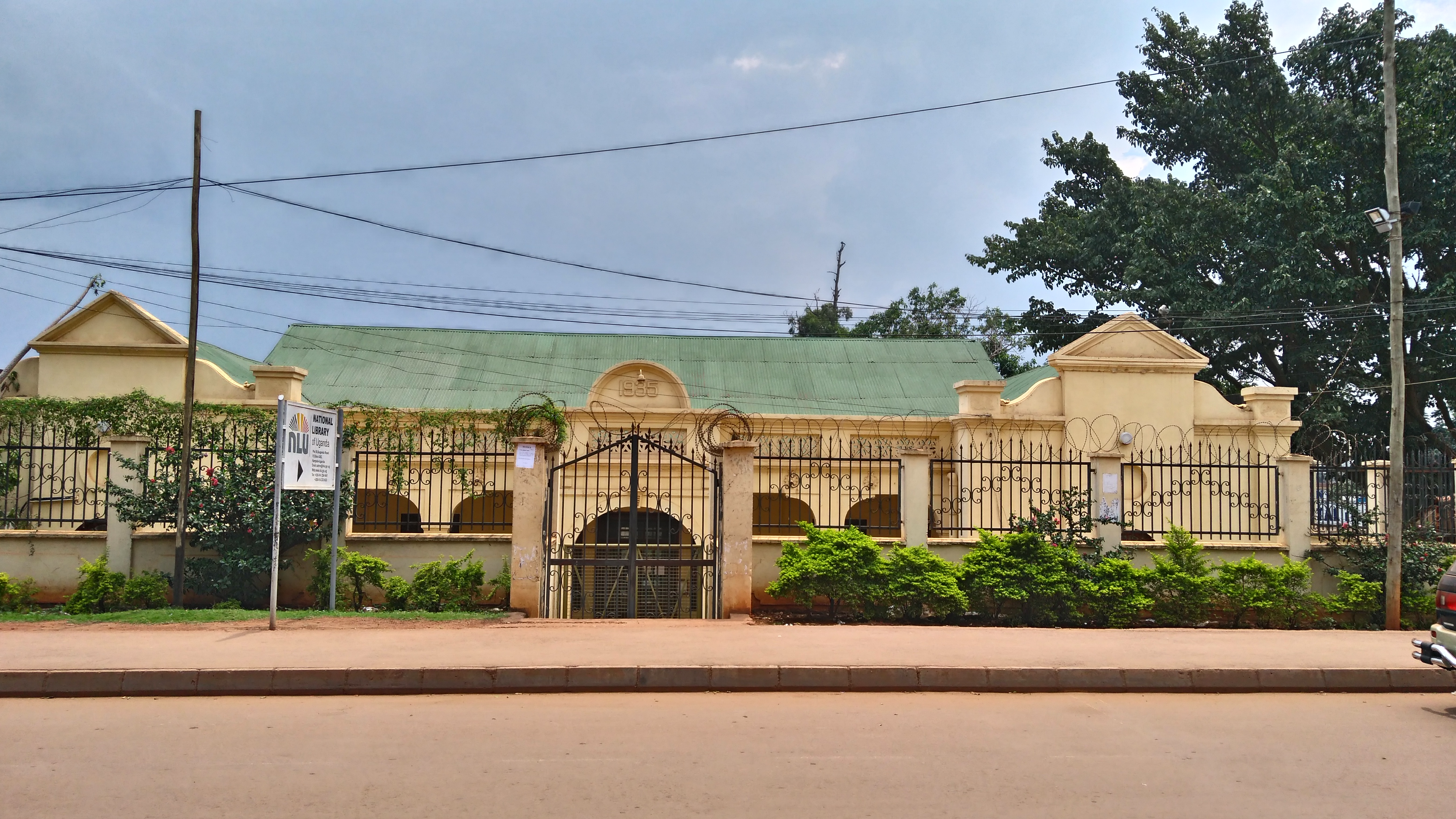
- Location: Kampala, Plot 50, Buganda Road, Uganda
- Type: National
- Established: 2003

Collection
- Items collected: Books, periodicals, maps
- Legal deposit: yes

Access and use
- Population served: General public

Other information

The National Library of Uganda was established by an Act of Parliament in 2003, replacing the Public Libraries Board which was established in 1964.

It is the legal deposit library for Uganda and was under the directorship of Gertrude Kayaga Mulindwa. The National Library building is on Buganda Road in the city of Kampala.

== Partnerships ==
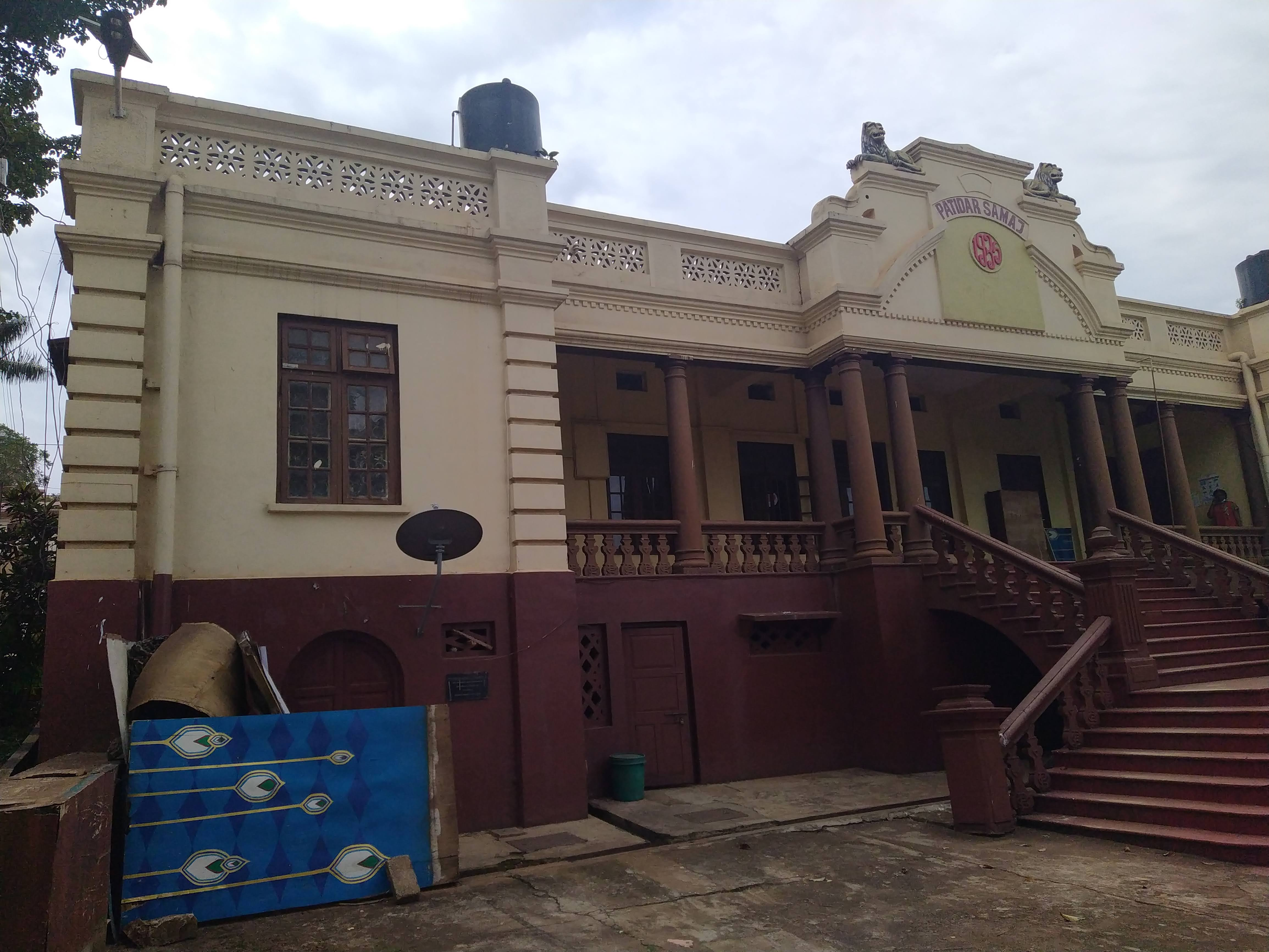
Uganda National Library at Buganda Road

In January 2010, the National Library of Uganda partnered with the Library of Congress to digitize local Ugandan materials for the World Digital Library, an internet-based resource to which libraries and archives from throughout the world contribute. In this partnership, the National Library of Uganda received funding, training, and equipment. The digitized material is not only preserved but is now available to a broader spectrum of library users.

In March 2019, the National Library of Uganda was connected to Airtel Uganda 4G Wi-Fi internet.

Book Aid International has donated several books to the National Library of Uganda, and launched a partnership project with the library and Worldreader to bring e-readers into children's corners. Ten libraries in Uganda now have e-readers, preloaded with titles to support education and reading.

The National Library of Uganda partnered with EIFL (Electronic Information For Libraries) to implement the ‘Digital Skills @ Your Public Library’ initiative.

== See also ==
- Adonia Katungisa

== Bibliography ==
- "Uganda", World Report 2010, The Hague: International Federation of Library Associations, OCLC 225182140, archived from the original on 29 June 2019, "Freedom of access to information" (Includes information about the national library)
- Gertrude Kayaga Mulindwa (2011). "National Library of Uganda: Its Beginnings, Services, Challenges and Future Prospects". Alexandria. 22 (2–3). UK: 23–32. doi:10.7227/ALX.22.2.4. ISSN 0955-7490.
