= Kasenda of Ndongo =

Map of the kingdom of Ndongo.

Nzinga Ngola Kilombo kia Kasenda was an Ambundu king of Ndongo, famous for having massacred the Portuguese merchant community at his capital of Kabasa and first launching a war against Portugal, thus starting the century-long Angolan Wars. King Kasenda was described as "a fearful and violent ruler", who quarreled with the soba ("lord") of Hari, one of the titleholders with royal blood with a claim on the Ndongo throne.

Kasenda took the throne in tumultuous circumstances. After the death of Ngola Kiluanje kia Ndambi, the most powerful Court officials took over in a palace coup to elect a successor. This failed as Kasenda overthrew them and secured power. He then acted aggressively to impose his authority, ordering numerous executions, a sign of insecurity on the throne. Jesuit missionaries in Angola described Kasenda as a ruler who "cuts off heads for nothing". He was opposed by royal family members in the region of Hari. Chief among them was Hari a Kiluanje.

Under these circumstances, Kasenda seems to have made overtures to the Portuguese led by Paulo Dias de Novais in order to counteract the internal resistance he faced to his rule. Novais established the city of Luanda in 1576 as he hoped to reach the silver mines reputed to exist at Cambambe, within Ndongo, but he was instructed by king Sebastian of Portugal to follow a policy of peaceful bilateral relations. As such, he signed an alliance with Kasenda. Novais offered his services to Ndongo and fought several times for the ngola against rebels. In exchange for military aid, king Kasenda would sell rebels, prisoners of war and his subjects sentenced to death for theft or adultery as slaves to the Portuguese, thus earning him great profits. Relations were so amicable that king Kasenda requested an ambassador for his capital of Kabasa and Novais dispatched Pero da Fonseca with a guard of 20 men for the task.

As king Kasenda gradually became secure on the throne, he sought a way to dispose of the Portuguese. The independent Portuguese merchants established in Ndongo also considered Novais an unwelcome interloper. One of their number, Francisco Barbudo d'Aguiar persuaded Kasenda that Novais intended to conquer his kingdom, and although even the Portuguese merchant community at Kabasa would not corroborate such an extreme accusation, after consulting with his advistors king Kasenda decided to have all Portuguese in Ndongo massacred and declare war on Portugal. In what became known as "the betrayal of the king of Ndongo", Kasenda mobilized his army under the pretext of fighting a rebel lord, but then had it turn on the Portuguese at the capital, who were killed and their property confiscated. Almost a thousand kongolese who were then at Kabasa were also massacred, which further damaged relations between Ndongo and Kongo. Portuguese merchants scattered throughout Ndongo were also killed.

Kasenda then sent out his army to destroy Luanda, but before reaching the city it was repulsed at the siege of Anzele. After suffering defeat, Kasenda requested peace, but this was rejected by Paulo Dias de Novais and so the ngola executed all of his counseilors who had advised in favor of war. Novais was fortunate that several sobas or tribal lord in the western fringes of Ndongo, around Luanda, offered him help against a ruler they considered tyrannical. King Álvaro I of Kongo also offered his full support to Novais, in the hopes of using Portuguese military capacity to further his own interests in Ambundu country in general and against Ndongo in particular. The Portuguese realized this, and one of Novais officers wrote that king Álvaro had offered them his support "not so much to help the Portuguese as to conquer Ndongo on his behalf". Kongo dispatched a large army to Ndongo but a battle on the river Bengo proved indecisive.

Kasendas policies alienated many in the western provinces of Ndongo, particularly in Ilamba and Quissama, and so the same rebels that Novais had once fought now switched to his side, supported him with auxiliary warriors and supplies and swore fealty to Portugal. Among the first to do so were Muxima Kitangonge, and Mokumbe. Several Kongo nobles also joined the Portuguese with their followers against Kasenda, as mercenaries. In 1581, the Portuguese defeated soba Songa of Kisama, who was one of Kasendas closest advisors, besides one of his fathers-in-law, and he joined the side of Portugal. Songa converted to Catholicism the following year, and was the first Ndongo lord to do so, adopting the name Dom Paulo de Novais, after Paulo Dias de Novais, who became his godfather. The Portuguese saw him as a key figure, and he was appointed capitão-mor da gente da terra or commander of auxiliaries. The Portuguese used their naval power to build fortresses along the Cuanza in the lands of allied chiefs to ensure rapid movement and resupply into the interior. An important step was the establishment of the fortress of Massangano at the crucial juncture of the Cuanza and Lucala rivers in 1582.

Following more defeats the battle of Casicola and the first battle of the Lucala, Kasenda sought to build alliances with places such as Matamba. When the Portuguese organized a major campaign up the Lucala river in 1590, with more than 15,000 African warriors and 120 European soldiers, they managed to reach Kabasa, but found the capital deserted. Some days later on December 29, 1590, the Portuguese were ambushed by forces of Ndongo and Matamba and forced to withdraw with substantial losses.

Kasenda died around 1592 and was succeeded by his son, Mbandi Ngola.

== See also ==
- List of Ngolas of Ndongo
- History of Angola
