= Mbandi Ngola of Ndongo =

Mbandi Ngola Kiluanje was a 16th and 17th century ruler of the kingdom of Ndongo in what is now Angola. He succeeded king Kasenda on the throne of Ndongo in 1592 and was the father of the notable Queen Nzinga. He died in 1617.

Mbandi Ngola succeeded Kasenda on the throne shortly after the victory of Ndongo over the Portuguese at the battle of Angoleme Aquitambo. His succession was not without tension however, as there were then three factions within Ndongo related to Mbandi Ngola who vied for control. The first of his wives was the daughter of Hango a Kakahito, whose relatives were highly influential in the northern and eastern parts of Ndongo, while the second was related to his second wife, Kangela kia Ngombe, whose father was the soba ("lord") of Dembo a Pe and whose power lied largely on the southern end of Ndongo along the banks of the Cuanza River. Finally, the third faction was represented by one of his wives who was the sister of Axila Mbanza, whose land were on the southwestern side of the Cuanza. This faction was connected to Kafushe Kambare, who sought to become king of Kisama, the weakly held western province of Ndongo. After a victory against Portuguese forces in 1596 there were a number of ''sobas'' who favoured making him king, and for which Mbandi Ngola feared him. Mbandi Ngola greatly favoured the faction of Hango a Kakahito because of the love he nurtured for that wife, but this put him at odds with the other factions.

As king of Ndongo, Mbandi Ngola fought against the Portuguese established at Luanda for the first twelve years of his rule. In spite of earlier setbacks, governor João Rodrigues Coutinho defeated Kafushe Kambare and Axila Mbanza and in 1602 built a fort in Cambambe. The defeat of Kafushe Kambare pleased Mbandi Ngola so much that he proposed to the Portuguese governor to become a vassal of Portugal and convert to Catholicism. After the Portuguese built the fort of Cambambe he requested peace. This was convenient to him, as Mbandi Ngola at the time feared revolts from his subjects. Governor Manuel Cerveira Pereira proceeded to discuss the matter in a council with his officers, who voted to end hostilities and a peace was signed in 1604.

In 1611, Mbandi Ngola relaunched the war against Portugal, with poor results. The then interim governor of Angola Bento Banha Cardoso signed a pact with a number of Imbangala bands, and with their aid the Portuguese advanced further into Ndongo, Cardoso built a fort at Ambaca and increased the number of Ambundu sobas or lords under Portuguese suzereinty at the expense of Ndongo.

Internally, Mbandi Ngola favoured his eldest daughter Nzinga above his other children and allowed her to sit in court sessions and to exercise with the army. He also allowed his wives brothers to commit numerous abuses that outraged the aristocracy of Ndongo. The native lords therefore banded together in a plot and lured him into an ambush in the lands of the rebel lord Kakulo ka Kabasa, near the Lucala river and overthrew him.

After his death in 1617, the Court officials favoured electing Mbandi Ngolas eldest son, Mbandi Ngola Kiluanje II. Yet this candidate was ultimately pushed aside by Ngola Mbandi, son of Kangela kia Ngombe and brother of Queen Nzinga. When he succeeded on the throne, the coalition of lords who had overthrown his father was not yet loyal to the new ruler. He sought to suppress any opposition to his rule by murdering his brothers and their mother, but this only bred dissatisfaction and dissent. The kingdom suffered a major invasion led by the Portuguese governor of Angola, Luís Mendes de Vasconcelos, still that same year.

== See alo ==
- List of Ngolas of Ndongo
- Angolan Wars
- Portuguese Angola
