= First Battle of the Lucala =

- Part of the Angolan Wars
Date	13 September 1585
Location	Lucala river, Angola
Result	Portuguese victory.

Belligerents
Portugal	Kingdom of Ndongo

Commanders and leaders
(Portugal) Luís Serrão	Kia Kasenda of Ndongo

Strength
>40 Portuguese soldiers 20,000 Ambundu auxiliaries	Unknown

Casualties and losses
Unknown	Heavy

The First Battle of the Lucala was a military action of the Angolan Wars between the Portuguese Empire and an army commanded personally by the king of Ndongo. It took place on September 13, 1586, and was a Portuguese victory.

== History ==
Portugal was involved in a war with the Kingdom of Ndongo ever since its king, Nzinga Ngola Kilombo Kia Kasenda had every Portuguese in his kingdom massacred in 1579.

Ndongo had previously suffered a major defeat at the Battle of Casicola against a Portuguese army commanded by captain-major André Ferreira Pereira. After Casicola, a great number of Ambundu tribal lords in the vicinity of Luanda switched their allegiance to Portugal, which allowed Paulo Dias de Novais to secure the region around the city. He then ordered the army to move into Cambambe to secure the mines therein.

Almost immediately afterwards however, the Portuguese suffered a setback when a foraging party of 100 men commanded by João Castanho de Velês was ambushed and almost completely massacred, about half a league from the mines, in the territory of soba Angola Calunga.

News of the debacle caused the lords of Ilamba to suddenly waver in their loyalty to Portugal. They feared that the Portuguese might not protect them in the event of a counter-attack by the ngola. In order to reassure the Ambundu lords, Paulo Dias de Novais decided to assemble all of his forces and personally command a punitive expedition, involving as many as 20,000 ambundu auxiliaries and many veteran Portuguese soldiers.

Manwhile, the king of Ndongo, Nzinga Ngola Kilombo Kia Kasenda decided to capitalize on the massacre of João Castanho de Velês and gathered his own forces to set out in person against Luanda once more. The mustering of troops was done with utmost secrecy and they departed divided in three squadrons, or embalos. At the command of the vanguard was lord Angola Calunga, who had led the massacre of Velês in his lands.

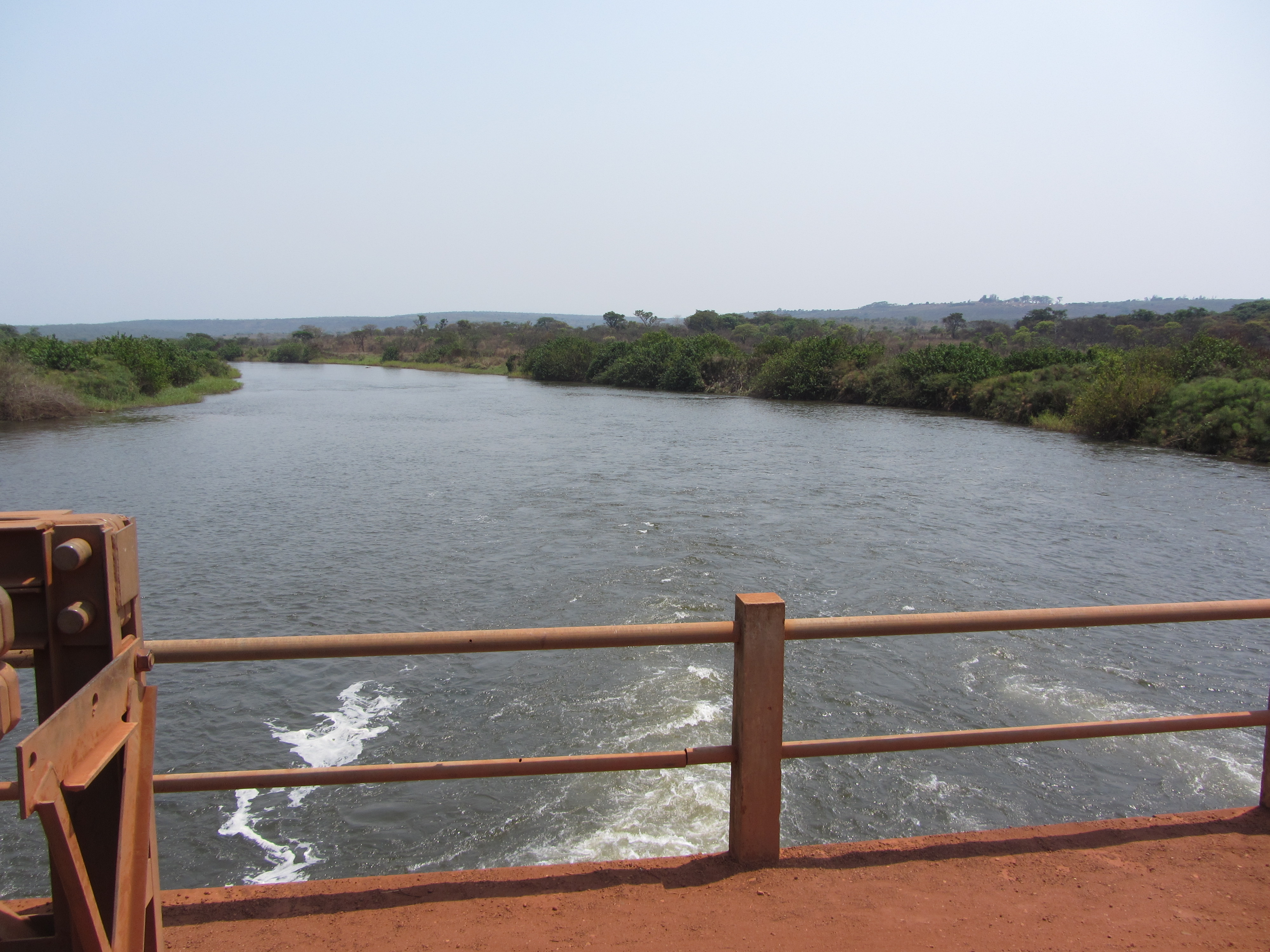
The Lucala near Calandula.

The Ndongo host began crossing the Lucala river on eight "great canoes", which of which carried about 80 to 90 people. Notwithstanding the preparations of the ngola, he was ambushed mid-crossing by the Portuguese, commanded by Luís Serrão. A detachment of 40 heavily equipped Portuguese veterans charged the forces of Ndongo vigorously, and those that had already crossed the Lucala were cut in two. Caculo Cacobassa betrayed the Portuguese and attacked them mid-battle however, which prevented Serrão from crushing the forces of Ndongo. While many downstream were killed, those upstream fled. A further 20 POWs were taken. 700 drowned trying to cross the Lucala.

The following day, the Portuguese crossed the Lucala and set out in pursuit of Caculo Cacobassa, who was captured and beheaded. The victory at the Lucala confirmed that of Casicola, and definitively pacified the lowlands around Luanda. The Ilamba province was the first to be conquered by the Portuguese, and its southern border was set by the Dande river, as well as by the Luinha and Lucala rivers to the east, and extended almost 40 kilometers to the west, up to the eastern side of Luanda and the Quilunda Lake, on the left bank of the river Bengo. It had valuable resources, such as salt pans and iron ore, which the Ilamba chieftaincies had been mining since long before the Portuguese .

The king of Benguela also sought to align himself with Portugal and submitted to Paulo Dias de Novais.

== See also ==
- Portuguese Angola
- Second Battle of the Lucala
