= Angolan Wars =

1579–1683 series of wars

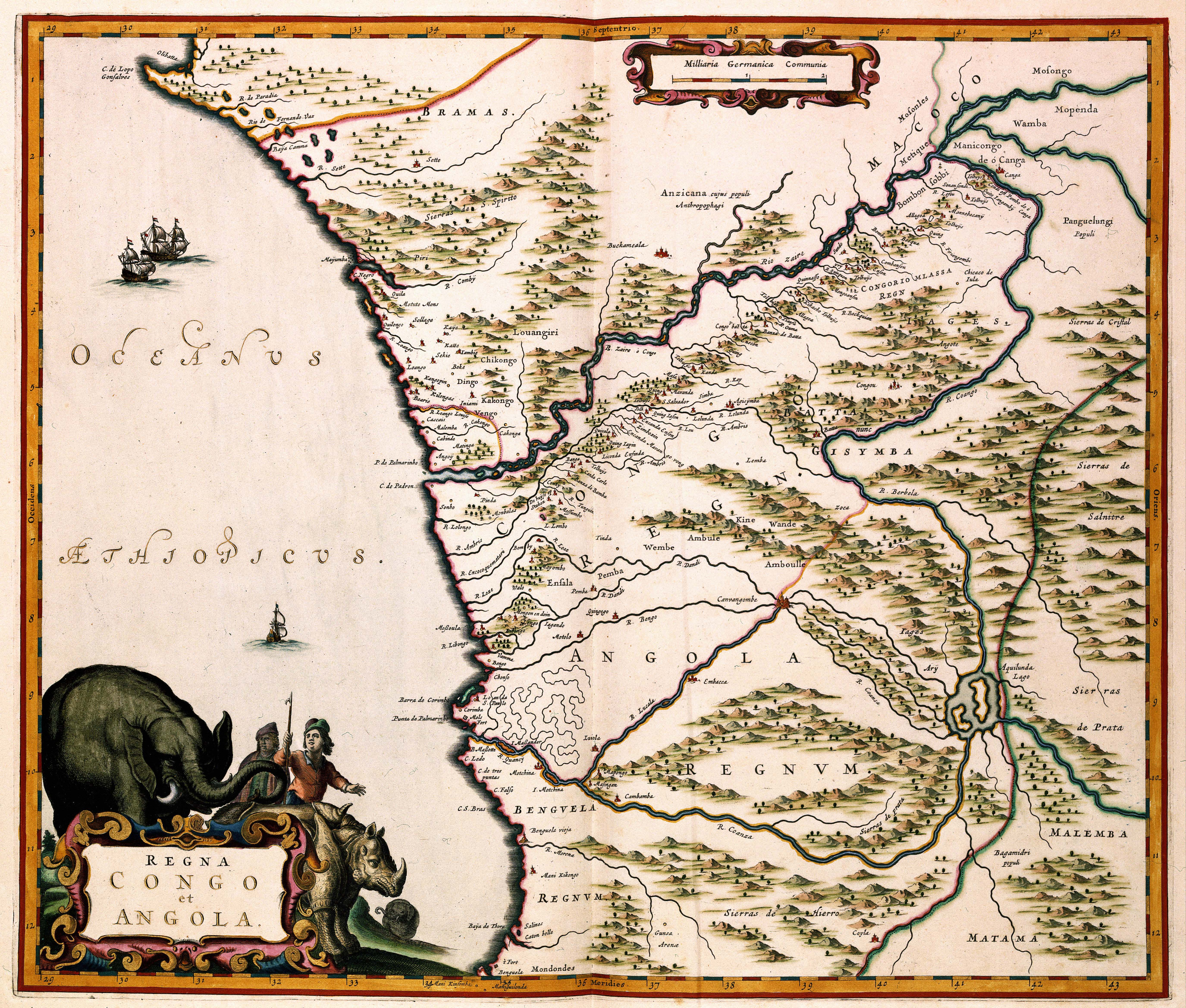
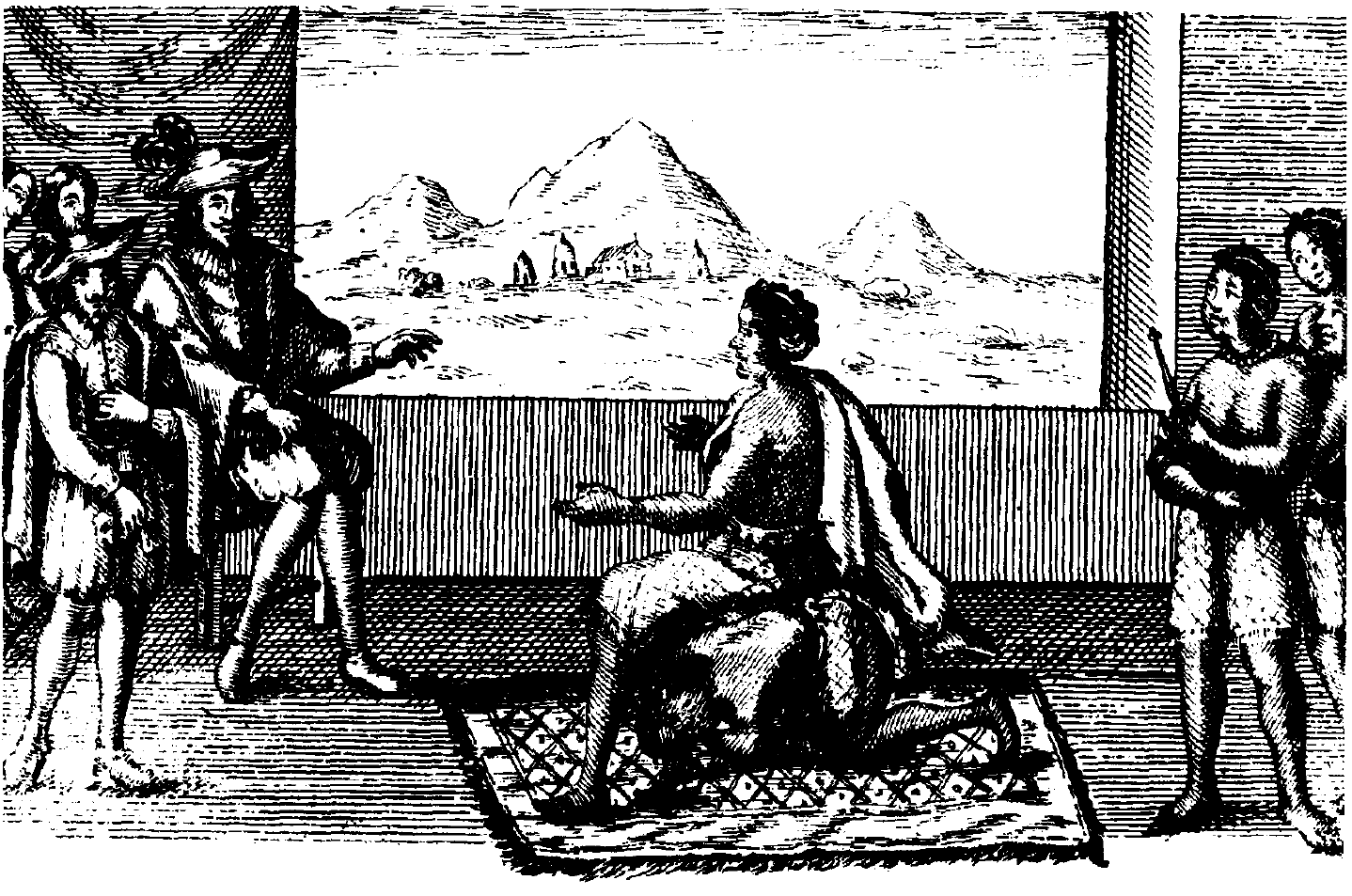
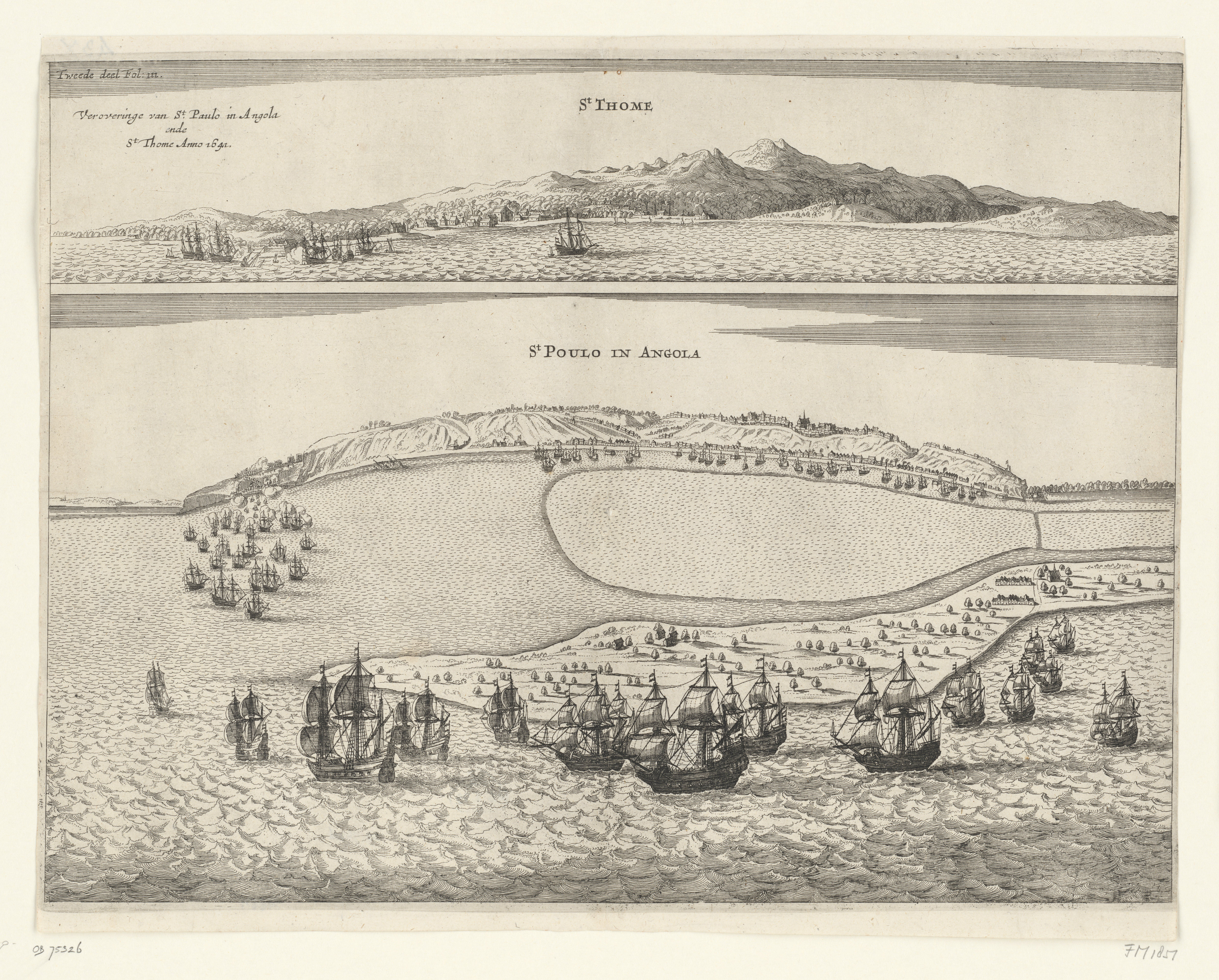
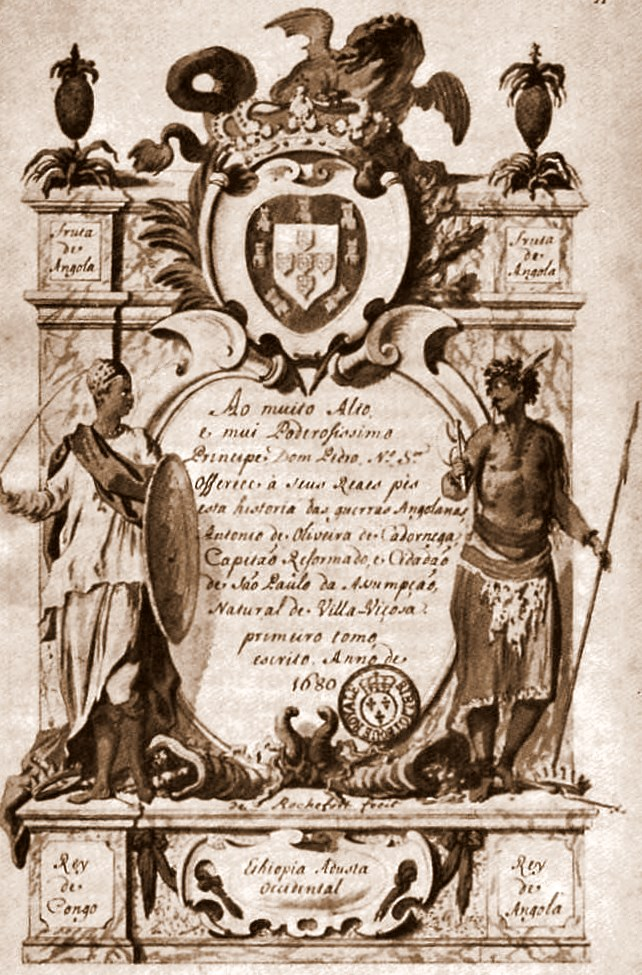
- From top to bottom, left to right: 17th century map of northwestern Angola; Meeting between Queen Nzinga and governor João Correia de Sousa; Dutch capture of São Tomé and Luanda; General History of Angolan Wars
Date	September 1579 – 7 September 1683 (103 years, 11 months and 3 weeks)
Location	Angola
Result	Portuguese victory: Disestablishment of Ndongo; Portugal vassalizes Matamba; Dutch attempts to capture Angola repulsed; Civil War in Kongo
Territorial changes	Portugal annexes Ndongo and the Dembos

Belligerents
Portuguese Empire; Kongo (till 1622); Kasanje (1639 on)	Ndongo; Kongo (1622 on); Matamba; Kasanje (till 1639); Libolo; Dutch West India Company; Quissama tribes

Commanders and leaders
Paulo Dias de Novais; Bento Banha Cardoso; Luís Mendes de Vasconcelos; João Correia de Sousa; Pedro César de Meneses; Salvador de Sá; Luís Lopes de Sequeira X Hari a Kiluanje; Filipe I of Ndongo; Pascoal of Kassange; Kabuku ka Ndonga	Kasenda of Ndongo; Mbandi Ngola; Ngola Mbandi; Queen Nzinga; Njinga a Mona (executed); Francisco I of Matamba; Verónica I of Matamba; Pedro II of Kongo; António I of Kongo †; Garcia II of Kongo; João I of Ndongo (executed); Kulashingo of Kasanje (executed); Cornelis Jol; Cornelis Nieulant; Heynderick van Redinckhoven; Thijmen Pietersen; Adriaen Lems; Cornelis Ouwman

The Angolan Wars (Portuguese: Guerras Angolanas) were a long series of conflicts in modern-day Angola involving Portugal, the Kingdom of Ndongo, the Kingdom of Kongo, the Kingdom of Matamba, the Kingdom of Kasanje, the Kingdom of Libolo and the Dutch West India Company primarily, that lasted from 1579 to 1683.

Paulo Dias de Novais founded Luanda in 1576 and hostilities broke out three years later when the king of Ndongo had the Portuguese merchant community in his capital massacred. Conflict then gradually drew in every neighbouring power along with the Dutch West India Company. Though few in number, the Portuguese fielded heavier equipment but more importantly were able to mobilize large numbers of African auxiliaries, on whom the success of operations in the harsh African hinterland depended. Queen Nzinga distinguished herself by forging "the largest coalition of angolan states in the 17th century" against the Portuguese, who ultimately emerged as the main power in the region in spite of severe adversity.

Hostilities primarily involved Portugal and Ndongo between 1579 and 1622. After negotiating a peace treaty on behalf of Ndongo, Queen Nzinga seized power and civil-war erupted between her and the rival claimant Hari a Kiluanje, who sought the support of Portugal. Nzinga in turn associated herself with the controversial Imbangala. The Dutch West India Company captured Benguela and Luanda in 1641, and entered into an alliance with Queen Nzinga and the Kongo, among others, against the Portuguese. After a period of isolation in the interior during which the Portuguese fought against Nzinga, the Dutch and Kongo surrounded and cut-off from the sea, Salvador Correia de Sá restored Angola to Portuguese rule in 1648. Queen Nzinga then signed a peace in 1656 and shifted to a policy of subordination to Portugal and support for Catholicism. The final 27-year period was marked by the defeat of Kongo at the Battle of Ambuíla, the annexation of Ndongo by Portugal and the definite vassalization of Matamba, which in effect brought the Angolan Wars to a close.

These conflicts radically altered the balance of power in the region and marked it deeply. They were recorded primarily by António de Oliveira Cardornega in General History of the Angolan Wars, an epic narrative in three volumes that followed the style of Portuguese chronicles of Asian and American conquest.

== Context ==
The Portuguese reached Angola in 1482 during the reign of King John II. Portuguese explorer Diogo Cão contacted the Kingdom of Kongo and established friendly relations between the two realms. In 1491, the king of Kongo converted to Catholicism, and his kingdom henceforth became frequented by Portuguese ambassadors, missionaries and merchants, some of whom settled in the country. Relations remained stable and in 1568 Portugal dispatched an expeditionary corps to help king Álvaro I suppress an uprising or invasion of the "Jagas" in Kongo, which greatly strengthened relations between the two kingdoms and earned the Portuguese high regard by the kings of Kongo. Kongo henceforth paid Portugal a fifth of all nzimbu fished at the Island of Luanda as tribute.

To the south of Kongo, the Kingdom of Ndongo had sought to establish direct contact with Portugal as early as 1518. Ndongo seems to have been created from Kongo, and the rulers of Kongo claimed overlordship over the kingdom, but had little real control. Portugal dispatched a first diplomatical mission to Ndongo in 1520 and although it was unsuccessful, Ndongo sent another to Portugal in 1549, which resulted in Paulo Dias de Novais being dispatched to Ndongo at the head of a second mission. Upon his return, he obtained a grant to establish a colony in Angola. Ndongo sent another embassy to Lisbon in 1575, headed by Dom Pedro da Silva Manuel, an ethnic Kongolese raised in Portugal. He bore gifts of copper, silver, slaves and portions of Kikongo wood. Silva Manuel was well received, admitted to the Order of Santiago as a knight and given grants for his support.

In 1576 Paulo Dias de Novais founded the city of Luanda. Novais hoped to obtain access to the legendary silver mines that were purported to exist at Cambambe in the kingdom of Ndongo and he had orders from King Sebastian to follow a policy of peaceful bilateral relations. He therefore signed an alliance with the ngola ("king") of Ndongo, Nzinga Ngola Kilombo Kia Kasenda. Novais offered his services to Ndongo and fought several times for the ngola against rebels. In exchange for this military aid, king Kasenda would sell rebels, prisoners of war and his subjects sentenced to death for theft or adultery as slaves to the Portuguese, thus earning him great profits.

Relations between Ndongo and Portugal were so amicable that king Kasenda requested an ambassador for his capital of Kabasa and Novais dispatched Pero da Fonseca with a guard of 20 men for the task.

== The Ndongo Wars, 1579-1622 ==
The Kingdom of Ndongo.

Notwithstanding the friendly relations with the king of Ndongo, Novais was considered an unwelcome intruder by the numerous freelance Portuguese traders already in the region, and some sought to disrupt relations between the two.

The experienced and influential trader Francisco Barbudo d'Aguiar quarreled with Pero da Fonseca at Kabasa and so he claimed to king Kasenda in a private audience that Novais was preparing to conquer his kingdom for its mines, that Fonseca was a spy and his entourage a fifth column. Kasenda had the Portuguese community assemble before him the following day, to hear the allegations of Barbudo, which they denied in astonishment but the king disregarded their arguments. After consulting with his advisors therefore, the ngola was persuaded to have all the Portuguese at Kabasa massacred. Barbudo however was also executed, because the king believed that "it was not right that one should live who had caused the death of his countrymen". The same fate befell the Portuguese merchants scattered throughout the country and their property was seized. Kasenda also massacred almost a thousand kongolese who were then at Kabasa, which further damaged relations between Kongo and Ndongo.

The betrayal of the king of Ndongo as it became known marked the beginning of hostilies between Ndongo and Portugal. The outbreak of the war also stranded ambassador Dom Pedro da Silva Manuel in Lisbon, and for the following eighty years Ndongo ceased trying to have diplomatic relations with Europe directly.

=== The First Ndongo War, 1579-1604 ===
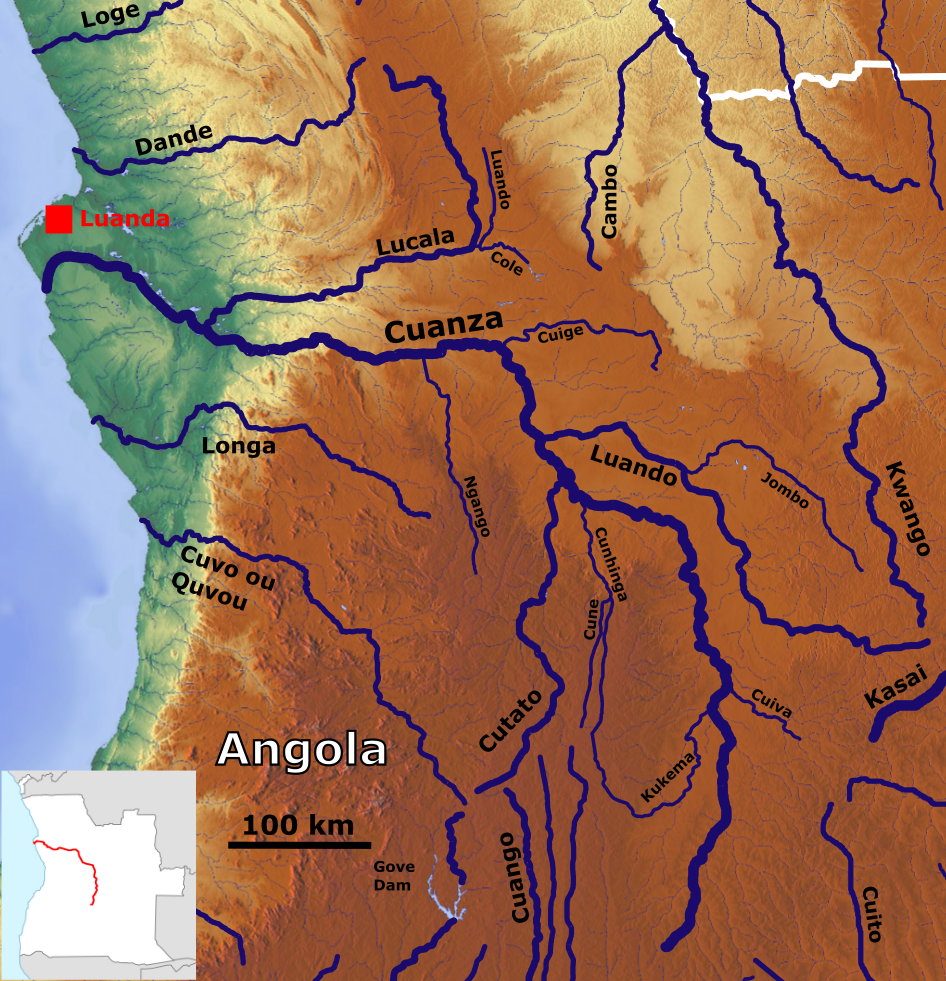
The Cuanza river system.

After the massacre at Kabasa, king Kasenda began assembling an army to destroy Luanda. Novais was camped with 60 Portuguese soldiers and 200 Africans near the Kwanza river at that time and he received an envoy from the ngola with a message not to proceed any further into Ndongo. Out of suspicion, the Portuguese commander relocated his troops to Anzele, in Ilamba, between the rivers Cuanza and Bengo, ten or twelve leagues from Luanda, where he erected a timber fort, equipped with two cannon. Only twenty days later did he receive news of the massacre and the approaching Ndongo army. Far from being intimidated, Novais inspired his men with the hope of avenging the massacre. At the siege of Anzele, the Portuguese were attacked by 12,000 warriors but the artillery fire threw the Ambundu into disarray and a Portuguese sortie forced them to withdraw. King Kasenda then requested peace, but Novais denounced him and rejected terms, upon which the king of Ndongo executed his advisors.

Meanwhile, on 23 February 1580 a fleet arrived from Portugal with reinforcements and among their number were two Jesuit fathers, one of which, Father Baltasar Barreira, promptly travelled to Kongo to request military aid. With his forces now numbering 1200 men among Europeans and Africans, Novais sailed up the Cuanza on two galliots, one small caravel and two batels, and for two months he fought against hostile lords along its banks and reduced several to vassalage, under the tropical rain. Ndongo was divided in hundreds of small regions ruled by local tribal lords, called sobas. Novais established a new fortified camp at Mocumbe on 16 November, and for the following eight months he remained there with his forces scouting the surrounding territory, skirmishing with hostile sobas, and baptizing others who sided with Portugal. Still in 1581, soba Songa of Quissama converted to Catholicism along with 400 others after being defeated, and he adopted the name Dom Paulo de Novais, in deference to Paulo Dias de Novais.

As a result of Father Barreiras efforts, on early 1581, Kongo marched to the aid of Novais with a 60,000 man army that included 120 Portuguese but the battle they fought with the forces of Ndongo by the river Bengo proved indecisive. By July, Novais was already running low on provisions and many of his comrades had been decimated by tropical disease, but Father Barreira exhorted the Portuguese at Luanda to organize a relief expedition that reached Mocumbe on the 24th.

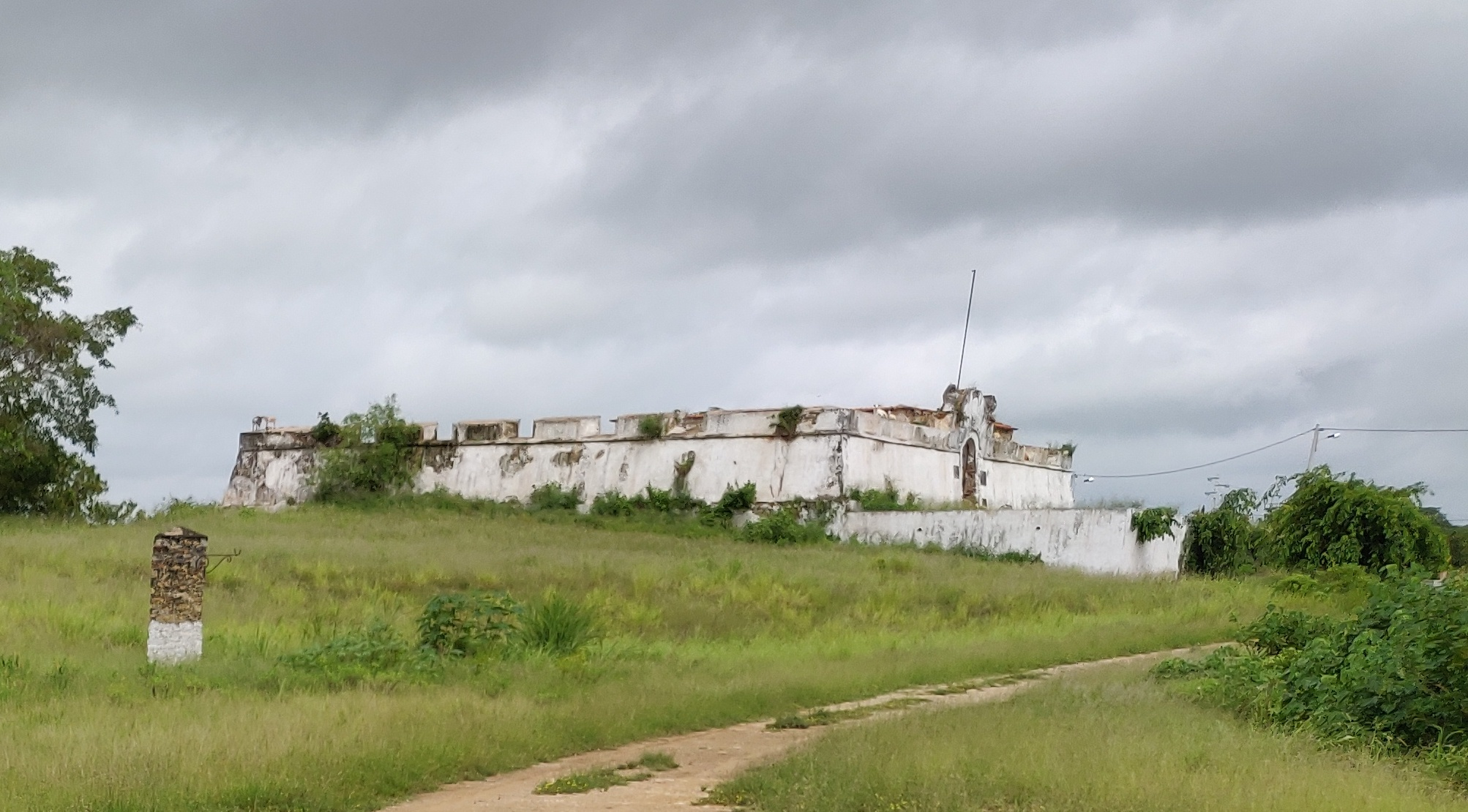
The Fortress of Massangano.

For the following eight years, Novais fought several battles against Ndongo, vassalized and converted numerous sobas and founded Massangano in 1582. Kia Kasendas reputation for cruelty led many sobas to side with the Portuguese. In 25 August 1585 captain André Ferreira Pereira scored an important victory with 130 Portuguese soldiers and as many as 10,000 auxiliaries against an Ndongo army with a considerable part of its nobility, at the Battle of Casicola. This allowed the Portuguese to pacify the region of Ilamba around Luanda as many hostile lords switched their allegiance to Portugal in the aftermath. Later in September of that same year, king Kasenda set out against the Portuguese at the head of his forces in person but he was ambushed and routed at the First Battle of the Lucala, which confirmed the victory of Casicola.

In 1586, Paulo Novais was attacked by an immense force. Even though he was very outnumbered, only having at his disposal about 100 Portuguese and a number of African soldiers, he was able to achieve victory against the attackers, mainly due to the bravery of his men and how well he conducted the defence.

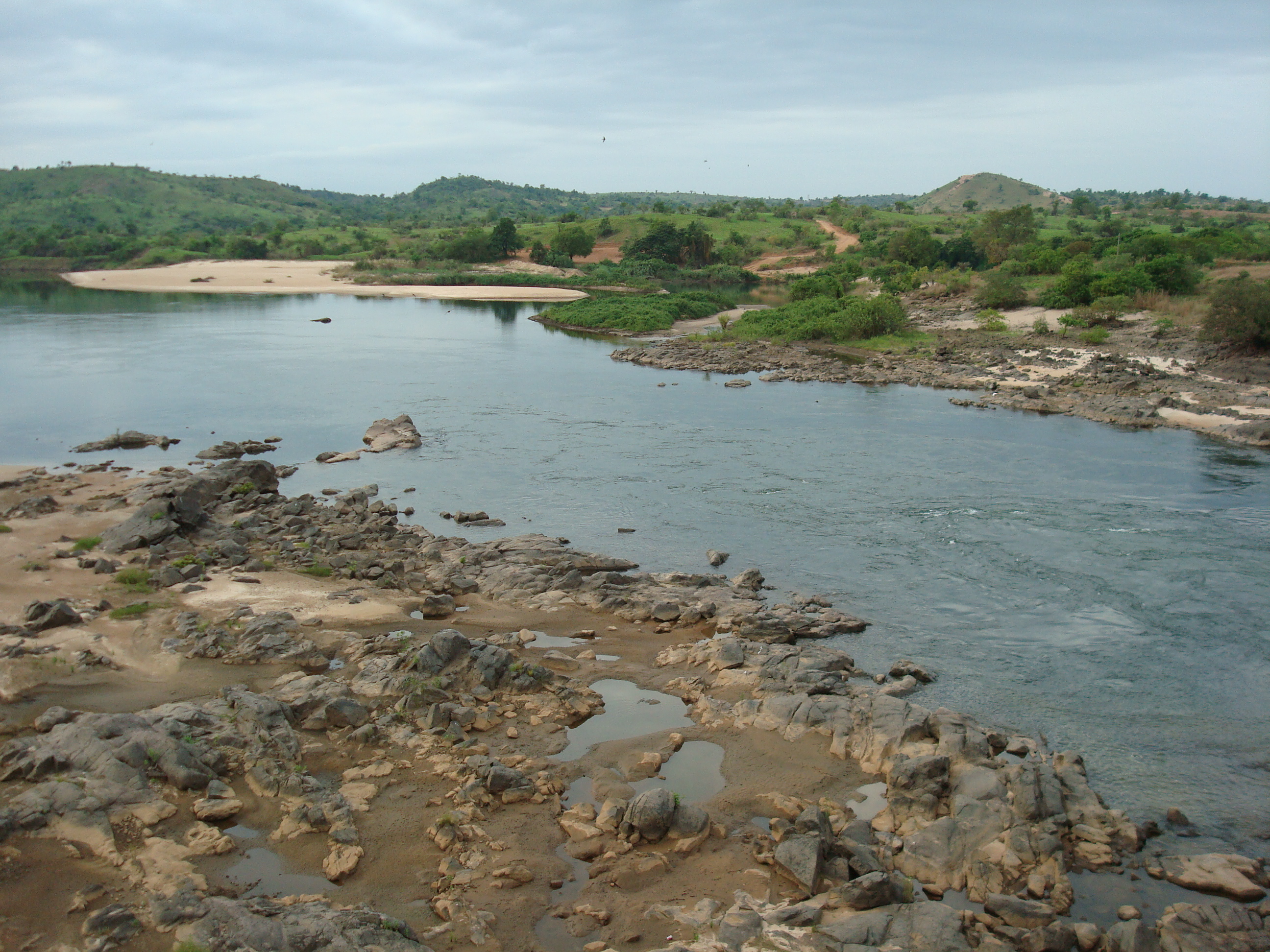
Geography of the Cambambe region.

Novais died on 9 May 1589, and was buried in a simple tomb in front of the church of Massangano. He had funded the Angola venture out of his own pocket and died bankrupt. His successors decided to proceed with the war against Ndongo until the mines of Cambambe had been secured.

For the next fifteen years the few but heavily armed Portuguese undertook several campaigns against Ndongo with the support of a great number of auxiliary warriors supplied by vassal or allied African lords, established new settlements and forts in the interior, captured the salt mines of Quissama, which deprived Ndongo of its most valuable export, and finally secured the region of Cambambe, where a fort was built. The silver mines rumoured to exist there however, were found to contain only lead.

Shortly after the construction of the Fort of Cambambe just 70 kilometers from the capital of Ndongo, the successor of king Kasenda, Ambandi Angola, requested peace and governor Manuel Cerveira Pereira proceeded to vote the matter in a council with his closest men. His officers voted to end hostilities and a peace was signed in 1604.

=== The Second Ndongo War, 1611-1622 ===
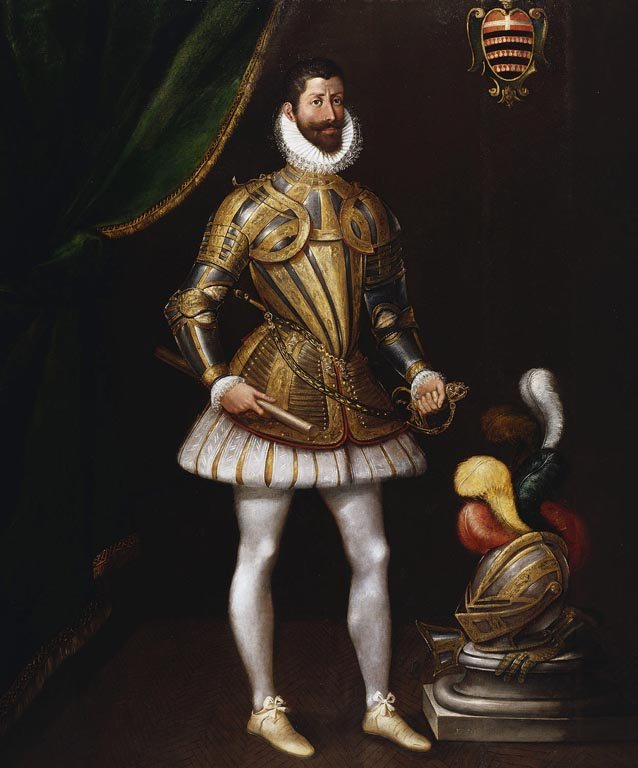
Governor Luís Mendes de Vasconcelos.

In 1611 the king of Ndongo Ambandi Angola began attacking the market fairs in the interior and the Portuguese merchants that took part in them. Governor Bento Banha Cardoso prepared a new campaign against Ndongo and signed a pact of alliance with a number of Imbangala warlords, who would henceforth serve the Portuguese as mercenaries. Among them was Kulashingo of Kasanje, who crossed north over the Cuanza along with his war-band with Portuguese support and settled on the fringes of Portuguese Angola. His was the most powerful of the Imbangala bands.

Cardoso managed to temporarily pacify the region, build a fort at Ambaca and bring the number of Ambundu sobas under Portuguese suzerainty to a total of 78.

After his campaign against Ndongo, Cardoso had to fight off an invasion by the Dembos ruler Nambuangongo, who almost reached Luanda in search of food. A period of peace then subsided over the region, which Cardoso considered to be convenient as gunpowder was almost exhausted in Angola.

Cardoso was succeeded in the Autumn of 1615 by Manuel Cerveira Pereira, who had persuaded king Phillip III to establish a new colony at Benguela. While preparing the expedition, Pereira pacified some rebellious lords in the interior, and eighteen months after returning to Luanda, he headed south, leaving the city in charge of António Gonçalves Pita. Cerveira Pereira reached the region of Benguela but found that the Kingdom of Benguela had been wiped out by the Imbangala, and the area was so depopulated and devoid of economic activity that he proceeded further south with his expedition. By that point, the land south of the Cuanza had been "demolished and destroyed by Imbangala activity".

The second war against Ndongo reached new heights in 1617. Early in this year Ambandi Angola was succeeded on the throne by Angola Ambandi, who violently persecuted political rivals, killed a half-brother, his half-brothers' mother, her siblings, the Court major-domo, numerous officials and their families, forcibly sterilized his three sisters, Funji, Mukambu and Nzinga, and killed the latters son. Angola Ambandi also rejected diplomacy with the Portuguese and gathered an army to attack them.

In Luanda meanwhile, the Portuguese governor was succeeded in office by Luís Mendes de Vasconcelos, who had proposed to connect Angola and Mozambique by land and annex Ndongo, a project for which he had the support of many dissatisfied Ambundu lords that voluntarily joined his forces. Among them was a rival claimant to the throne: Hari a Kiluanje, lord of Pungo Andongo.

Ambaca was besieged by an army commanded by Caita Calabalanga, the last powerful soba still loyal to Angola Ambandi but this time the forces of Ndongo were decisively routed in battle by the Imbangala mercenaries and Vasconcelos then marched on Kabasa practically unopposed. The campaign in Ndongo continued for the next four years and caused catastrophic devastation, 190 sobas became tributary vassals of Portugal, the Portuguese captured important people close to Angola Ambandi and the ngola himself fled with his Court to the Islands of Quindonga, in the Kwanza River. The war in Ndongo coincided with a crippling drought. Vasconcelos also secured the allegiance of the lords of the hilly and densely forested Dembos region, which had been disputed by Kongo and Ndongo.

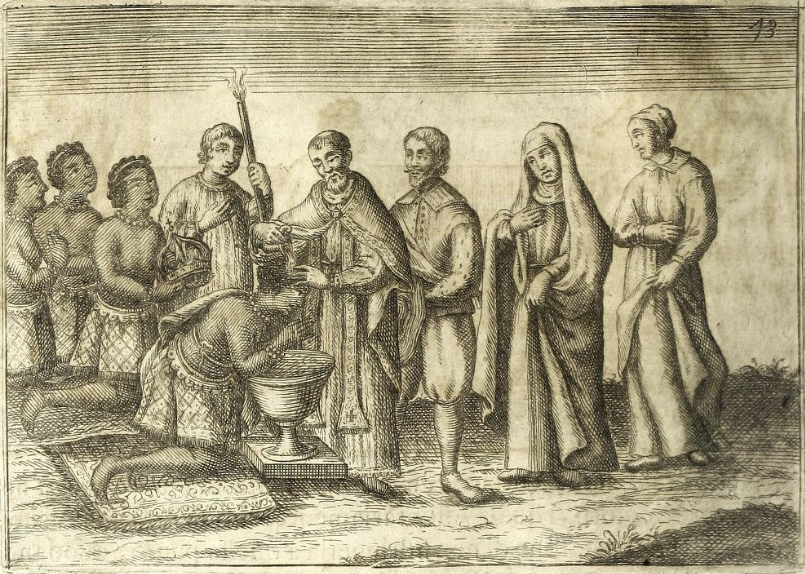
The baptism of Queen Nzinga.

Vasconcelos was succeeded in office by João Correia de Sousa, who considered the war with Ndongo inexpedient and began peace talks. Angola Ambandi dispatched his sister Nzinga as an ambassador and while in Luanda she converted to Catholicism, adopting the name Ana de Sousa. Her conversion secured Portuguese support for her personal ambitions in Ndongo.

=== War against Kasanje ===
A major part of the terms negotiated by Nzinga was a military expedition against the Imbangala kingdom of Kasanje. They had originally been allowed to settle in Ndongo but then served under the Portuguese during heir campaigns against the kingdom in 1618 and 1619. Kasanje declared independence soon afterwards and caused great devastation on Ndongo with their raids. They also sheltered bandits and attacked the trade caravans and vassal sobas of both Portugal and Ndongo.

The cannibal Imbangala were routed in battle by the Portuguese and their African auxiliaries, who then laid siege to the capital of the kingdom. The siege proved difficult but after the Portuguese completed the encirclement and closed off the path to a nearby freshwater lagoon, the Imbangala surrendered, while the kasanje himself was captured.

The Imbangala leader Kulashingo was publicly executed at Luanda on 25 May 1622. The survivors elected Kalunga as the new kinguri and migrated to the lowlands between the Kwango River and the Lui, which would later be known as Baixa de Cassanje. Angola Ambandi tried to convince the Portuguese to attack the Imbangala here too, but to no avail.

=== War with Kongo ===
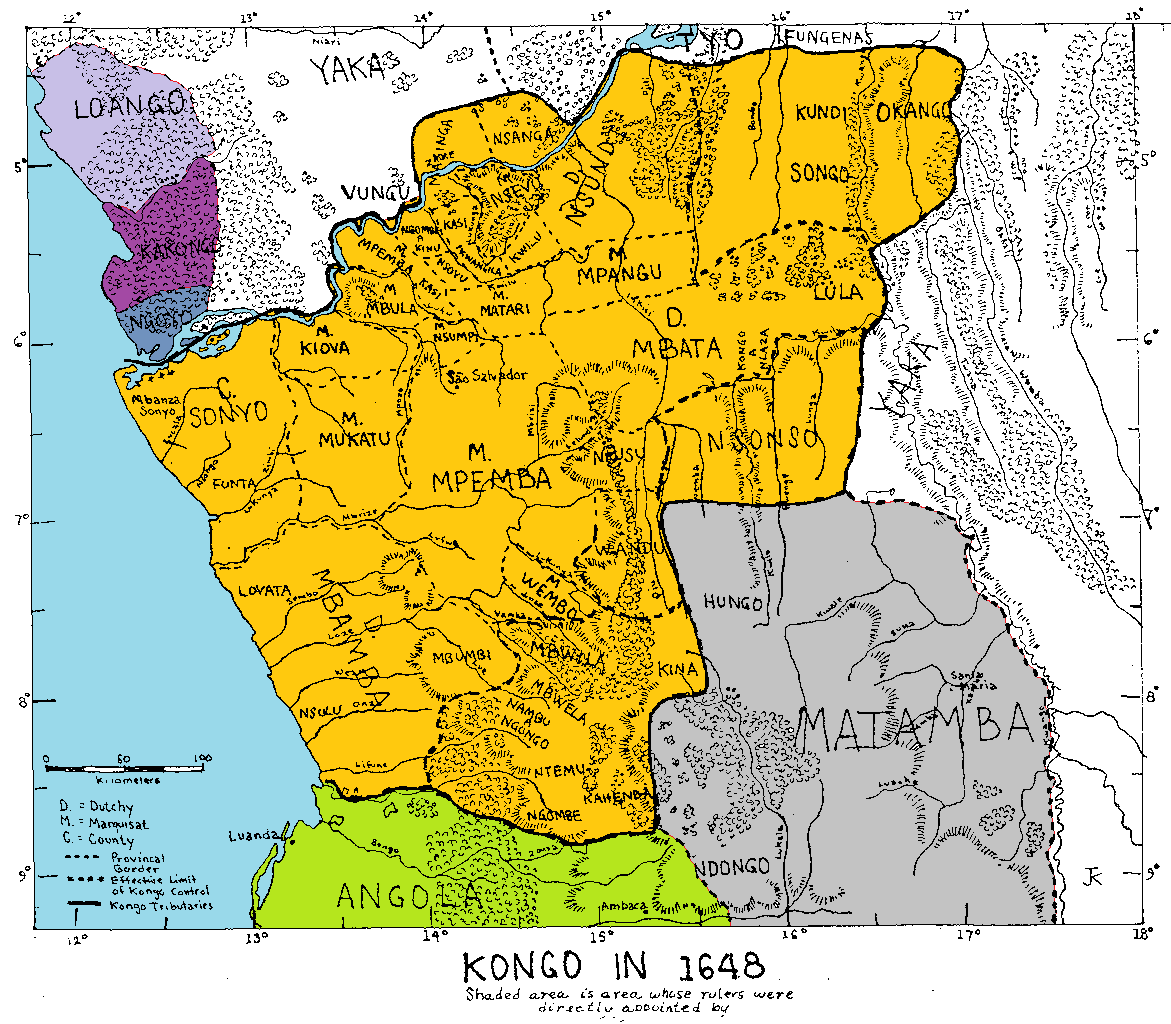
The Kingdom of Kongo in 1648.

While the Portuguese campaign against Kasanje was successful, many Imbangala refugees and escaped POWs sought refuge within Kongo. The Marquis of Pemba took in Imbangala warriors, runaway slaves and stole Portuguese cattle and as King Álvaro III refused to address Portuguese complaints the governor decided to declare war on Kongo, notwithstanding the protests of both the missionaries and the residents of Luanda.

A Luso-African army 30,000 men strong with numerous detachments of Imbangala mercenaries overran Nambuangongo in the Dembos region. King Álvaro died shortly afterwards without a clear heir and just as civil-war seemed about to erupt between rival aristocratic factions, they agreed to elect the capable Pedro II as king. He mustered the royal Kongo army and marched out to face the Portuguese in battle personally. Meanwhile, the Portuguese had already invaded Kongo and defeated the Duke of Bamba and the Marquis of Pemba at the Battle of Bumbi. At the Battle of Ambanda-Cassi however, the Luso-African army was routed by king Pedro II. Pedro also intervened in the Dembos and captured the region from Portugal.

Once news of the debacle reached Luanda, governor João Correia de Sousa was deposed in a mutiny and replaced with Bishop Simão de Mascarenhas, who favored reconciliation with Kongo. King Pedro II however decided instead to appeal to the Dutch Republic for an alliance against the Portuguese and on his command the Count of Soyo wrote letters to the Dutch States-General. Pedro II died however on 13 April 1624, before the arrival of a Dutch fleet and his son Garcia I was elected in his place, while civil-war loomed once more.

== The era of Queen Nzinga, 1624-1656 ==
Flag of the Dutch West India Company.

In Ndongo, several rogue Imbangala bands remained active ravaging the country. Lopo Soares Lasso was dispatched with a force to drive them off. He captured two Imbangala leaders but Kasanje remained unchecked.

After signing a peace with Portugal, the king of Ndongo fell into a deep depression. He died in unclear circumstances, some claiming that he committed suicide, others that Nzinga had murdered him. She would admit to this later in her life. Nzinga then assumed the regency for her nephew and heir. Angola Ambandi had entrusted his son to the care of the Imbangala leader Kaza expecting him to give the boy a military training and protection from any attempt on his life. This failed as Nzinga bribed Kaza into handing him over. She then had him murdered, usurped power in 1624 and violently persecuted anyone who did not accept her authority as well as the members of the royal lineages with competing claims to the throne.

Nzingas legitimacy was precarious however, as she was only a half-sister of Ngola Mbandi, born of a mother from among the lineageless slave dependents at the royal Court. She had little affiliation to any eligible lineages and her main connections were to people outside of them. Ndongo tradition specifically forbade anyone who showed hostility to the ngola to succeed on the throne or women. Her succession in part signified a palace coup against established laws in Ndongo. She offered free access to Ndongo for Portuguese merchants and missionaries, sacrificed the interests of the noble lineages, and replaced her predecessors policy of opposition to the Portuguese with one of "harmonious relations" in exchange for Portuguese withdrawal from Ambaca, which would have been rendered redundant by open access. Her rule caused a rift in Ndongo between her supporters and those of Hari a Kiluanje.

The new Portuguese governor of Angola Fernão de Sousa took office in July 1624 but spent the first six months of his tenure fortifying Luanda and defending it from attacks by the Dutch West India Company. A Dutch fleet commanded by Piet Hein attacked the city in 30 October but by 6 November it had been driven off. The Dutch then sailed to Soyo hoping to find the Kongo land army ready to move against Luanda but to their shock count António Manuel of Soyo now claimed to be a friend of the Portuguese, a loyal Catholic and refused to acknowledge Piet Heins letters or support him.

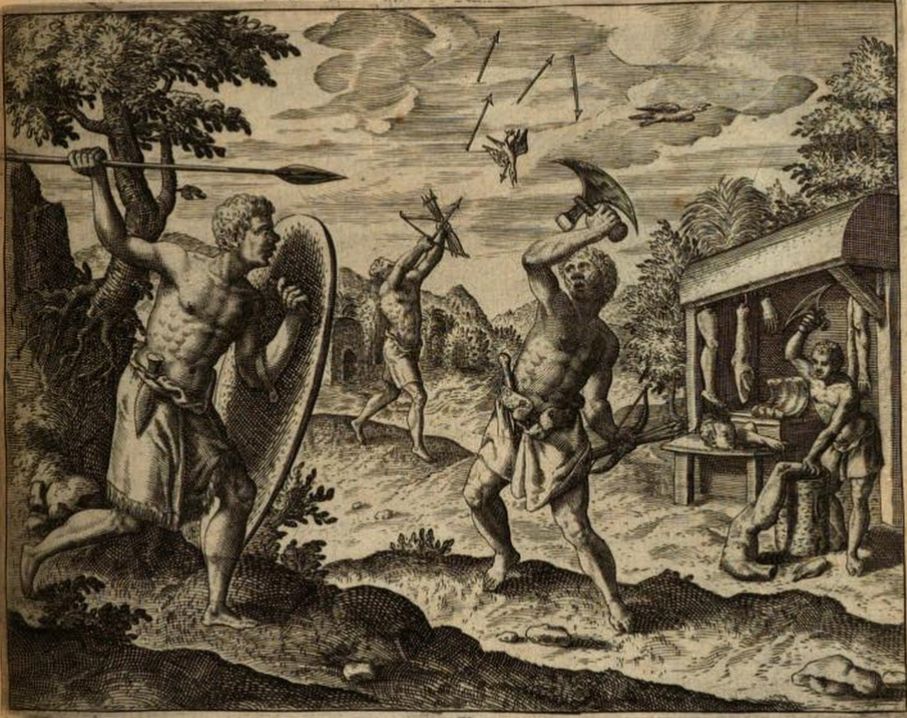
Imbangalas.

Relations between Luanda and Quindonga soured as Sousa demanded that Nzinga stop inciting the Ambundu farmers in Portuguese territory to join her army, while the queen insisted that the governor relinquish Ambaca and return prisoners of war. As negotiations stalled, Nzinga sought support among the neighbouring Imbangala, as they were also lineageless, reserved high positions to women, and had a record of hostility to both the Portuguese as well as Ambundu alike.

She allied with the Kaza Imbangala, one of the most powerful Imbangala bands south of the Cuanza, and secured the major title of tempaza, reserved to women of high status and which conferred wide powers in war as well as politics. They had mutual interests as Kaza was looking for a "first wife" to perform the role of tempaza and the associated rituals. Nzinga sought to present herself as the reincarnation of Tembandumba, a legendary warrior queen said to have established the yijilla or Imbangala laws and rituals. She sealed her alliance with Kaza by performing the same ritual Tembandumba was said to have done, sacrificing an infant using a mortar and pestle and producing the sacred maji a samba ointment from the ground up remains. She sought to raise forces to attack the Portuguese and introduced her subjects to Imbangala war-tactics and rituals. The bones of Ngola Mbandi were kept in a silver chest on the Island of Imbilas ("graves" in Ambundu) for the purpose of xinguila ("spiritual mediumship"), towards which she conducted human sacrifice under the pretext of satisfying the hunger of the dead Ngola Mbandis spirit, and through a network of spies and informants she promoted the belief among her subjects that she was a major seer able to metamorphose.

Meanwhile, governor Fernão de Sousa also prepared for war. The Imbangala allies of Vasconcelos had mostly defected or gone rogue, so Sousa recruited the band of Kinda and the band of Zanza, who was instructed to attack the hostile lord Cafuxi Cambari and obtain control of salt mines. Sousa however dismissed the idea of annexing Ndongo and turned to Hari a Kiluanje, whose claim to the throne he would support in the Ndongo civil-war. The governor met with Hari a Kiluanje at Ambaca and afterwards Queen Nzinga sieged Pungo Andongo, in early 1626.

=== War between Queen Nzinga and Portugal, 1626-1641 ===
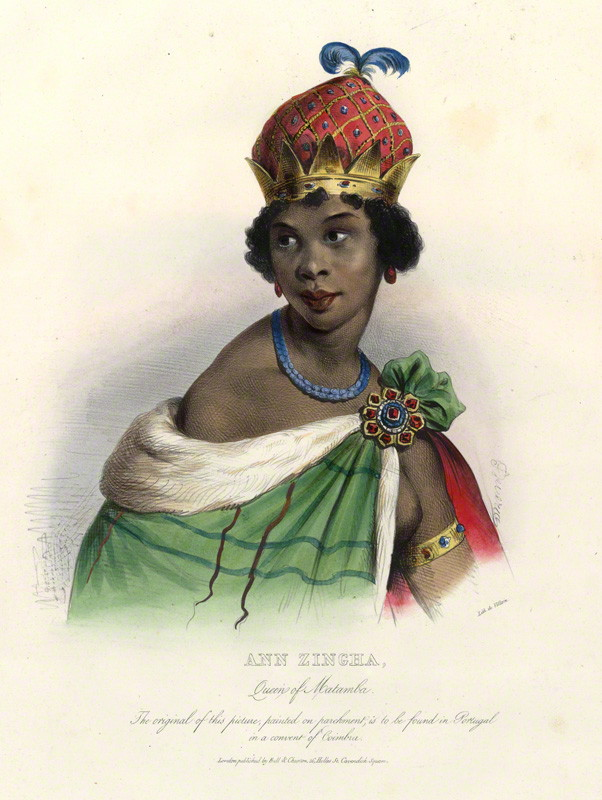
Queen Nzinga.

Pungo Andongo was relieved by an army commanded by former governor Bento Banha Cardoso, who forced Nzingas forces to withdraw. Cardoso then marched on all of Ndongo gathering the formal submission of the lords of the region and delivered the kingdom to Hari a Kiluanje. The Quindonga Islands were sieged in April but an epidemic broke out and after two months Queen Nzinga managed to slip through the lines with her supporters. Hari a Kiluanje fell victim to the plague but on 12 October 1626, governor Fernão de Sousa personally crowned at Pungo Andongo as king of Ndongo a brother of Hari a Kiluanje, who took the name of Dom Filipe de Sousa.

Queen Nzinga lived on the run with her supporters between 1626 and 1629, frequently relocating to avoid capture by Portuguese forces. Kongo recognized Nzinga as queen of Ndongo in 1627 and sent her gifts. Captain-major Bento Banha Cardoso died in August 1628 and he was replaced by Paio de Araújo de Azevedo, who abandoned pursuit on 29 May 1629, once he heard that Nzinga had fled east through the cliff of the Quina Grande das Ganguelas with the aid of the Songo people. These high cliffs ringed the Lui-Kwango valley. Nzingas alliance with Kaza and other Imbangala warlords proved no more lasting than her brief association with the Portuguese, as they all defected to the side of Luanda. Abandoned by the southern Imbangala, she sought refuge among the Kasanje Imbangala to the east, yet here too she was rebuffed. Kasanje and Nzinga became bitter rivals and would remain so from then on.

Nzinga was able to return to the Quindonga Islands once the Portuguese had withdrawn. Yet she realized that her best chance at safety lied in moving away from the Portuguese now that she was left without allies. She selected the wide lowland to the northeast, where the kingdom of Matamba had set the exceptional precedent of female rule in the region. Matamba queens had recently been forced to accept the suzerainty of Ndongo, but the Portuguese attack had left the region in disarray. Nzinga took advantage of this to conquer Matamba.

After she succeeded on the throne of Matamba, the queen forged the largest alliance of Angolan states of the 17th century, initially formed by Matamba, Kasanje and the Ndongo still loyal to her. It later included the tribes of Quissama, some in the Dembos and even the Kongo itself. The Portuguese now faced attacks from Queen Nzinga to the east, Kongo to the north, the Dutch to the west and the Quissama tribes to the south, who attacked their strongholds between the Kwanza and Bengo rivers with increasing persistence after 1635. In 1639 the Portuguese signed a treaty of peace and alliance with the Kingdom of Kasanje.

=== Dutch occupation of Luanda and Benguela, 1641-1648 ===
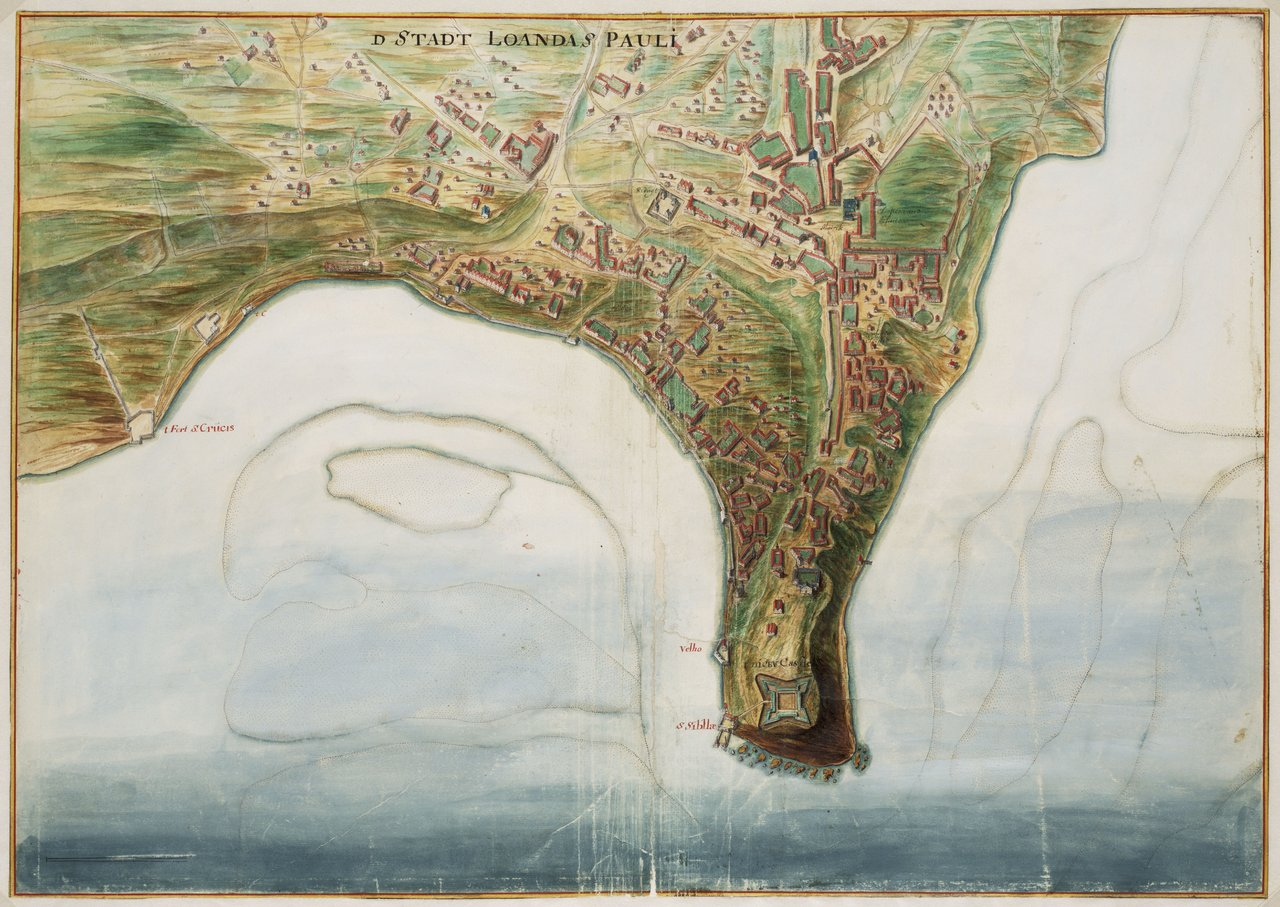
Dutch engraving of Luanda.

Benguela was occupied by a fleet of the Dutch West India Company on 2 February 1641, but its residents evacuated to Caconda further inland. Two months later Luanda rejoiced with the news of the Restoration of Portuguese Independence but although Portugal was no longer part of Spain the city was nevertheless attacked by a Dutch fleet commanded by Cornelis Jol on 23 August.

Governor Pedro César de Menezes ordered the evacuation of Luanda on 26 August and led most of the residents first to a camp by the Bengo, twenty miles away, then to Massangano, which they reached in December after an extremely perilous trek. Menezes was able to garner the support of a notable Imbangala warlord, Kabuku ka Ndonga, but the Portuguese could count on another loyal ally, king Filipe of Ndongo. From Massangano, but also from Muxima and Ambaca, the Portuguese resisted the Dutch and hostile African states from all sides. They renewed their alliance with Kasanje, and promoted Imbangala attacks on Nzingas forces to reduce pressure on their own.

With Luanda in Dutch hands, Nzinga quickly signed an alliance with the Dutch West India Company. In order to open a way to the coast and bypass the Portuguese she dispatched her lieutenant Njinga Amona with an army to the Dembos, most of which submitted to Nzinga. When one chief tried to resist Njinga Amonas advance, he was crushed. Nzinga received some firearms from the Dutch in return. King Garcia II of Kongo also concluded an alliance with the Dutch on 28 March 1642. Garcia then led his army south and with the support of the Dutch routed the Portuguese in battle on 24 September 1642. Meanwhile, king Nzinga camped with her forces in Portuguese territory at Kavanga and they were soon in contact with Kongo. From Kavanga she was able to secure the Dembos and could threaten the Portuguese stronghold of Ambaca.

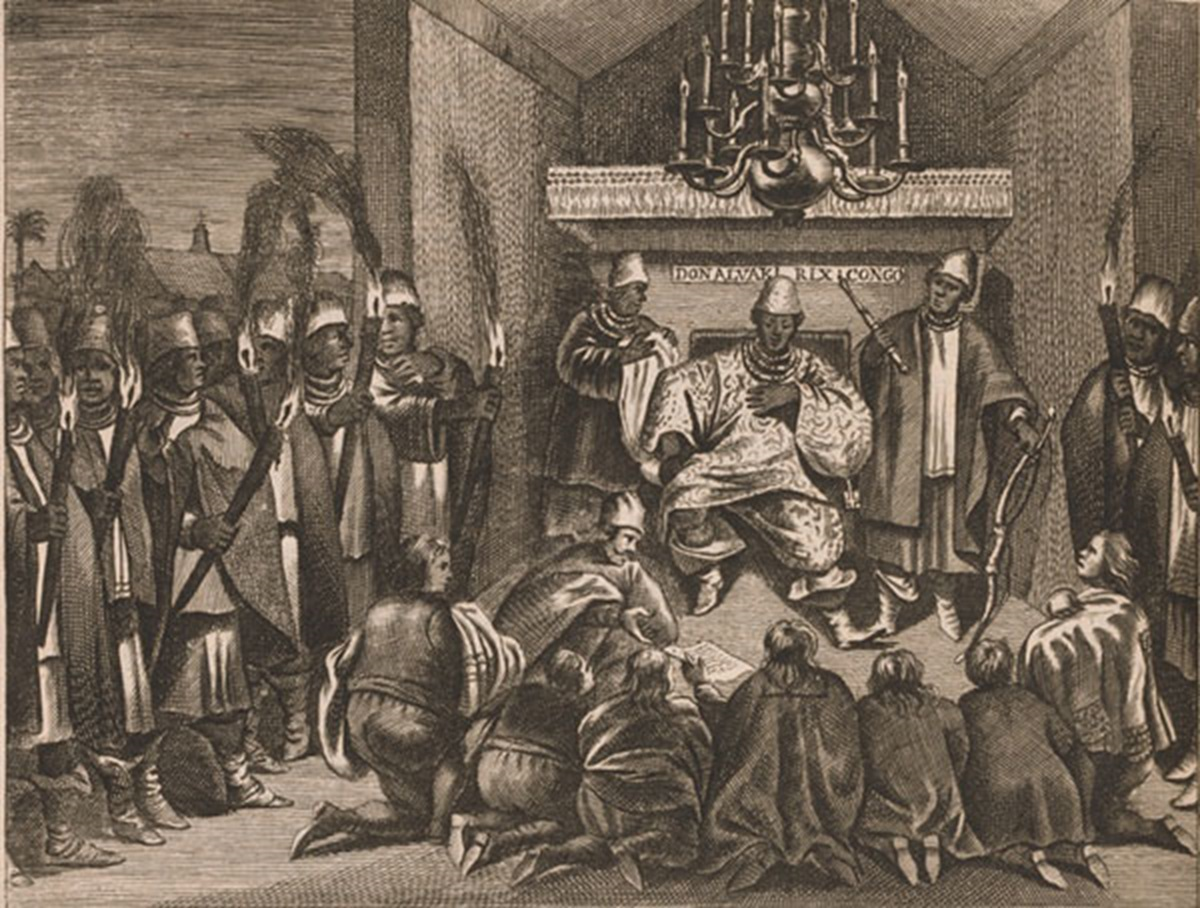
The king of Kongo receiving a Dutch embassy.

Notwithstanding official hostility, many Portuguese still travelled to Luanda to trade, while the Dutch were unable make inroads because the Portuguese blocked their advance inland and controlled the surrounding river waters. Kongo and Queen Nzinga also had difficulties supplying the Dutch with sufficient slaves, while the Portuguese kept contact with allied African lords in the hinterland and with the outside world through the rivers Bengo and Kwanza, at the mouth of which their ships could anchor, which helped fund their war-effort. Yet conditions for the Portuguese in Massangano were harsh as food was scarce and new clothing unobtainable. Thus director Cornelius Nieulant and Meneses signed a truce on 30 January 1643. This outraged king Garcia, who withdrew from the alliance to focus on internal issues, namely the rising tensions with Soyo that threatened civil-war.

The truce did not last four months however, and the Dutch attacked the Portuguese on 17 May once they suspected Meneses was plotting an attack on Luanda. Yet food stocks were by then dwindling both at Luanda as well and Massangano, and on July 1 a new truce was reestablished, allowing trade to resume.

In early 1644 Queen Nzinga intensified her attacks on Portuguese strongholds. At Luanda, director Hendrick van Redinckhoven obtained from Nzinga an increase in the supply of slaves, but this caused food to run so low that van Redinckhoven was forced to sell weapons and ammunition to the Portuguese in exchange for food, which displeased the Dutch West India Company board of directors in the Netherlands. The board had decided to reduce food shipments to Angola to save costs and force the colony to become self-sufficient, by encouraging soldiers to become farmers upon completing their commissions, however this failed as few were willing to settle in Angola and those who did had no knowledge of local agriculture. By the end of 1644, the Dutch had barely enough food to feed their garrison, which caused unrest.

Meneses was succeeded by Francisco de Souto-Maior, who reached the shores of Angola with a considerable reinforcement of 260 soldiers in October 1645. The WIC board of directors had issued warnings of an impending Portuguese expedition to Angola, however van Redinckhoven ignored them. To elude Dutch vigilance, Souto-Maior disembarked south of Luanda at Suto, near Cabo Ledo, and marched to Massangano with his forces divided in three detachments. Souto-Maior was received in triumph at Massangano.

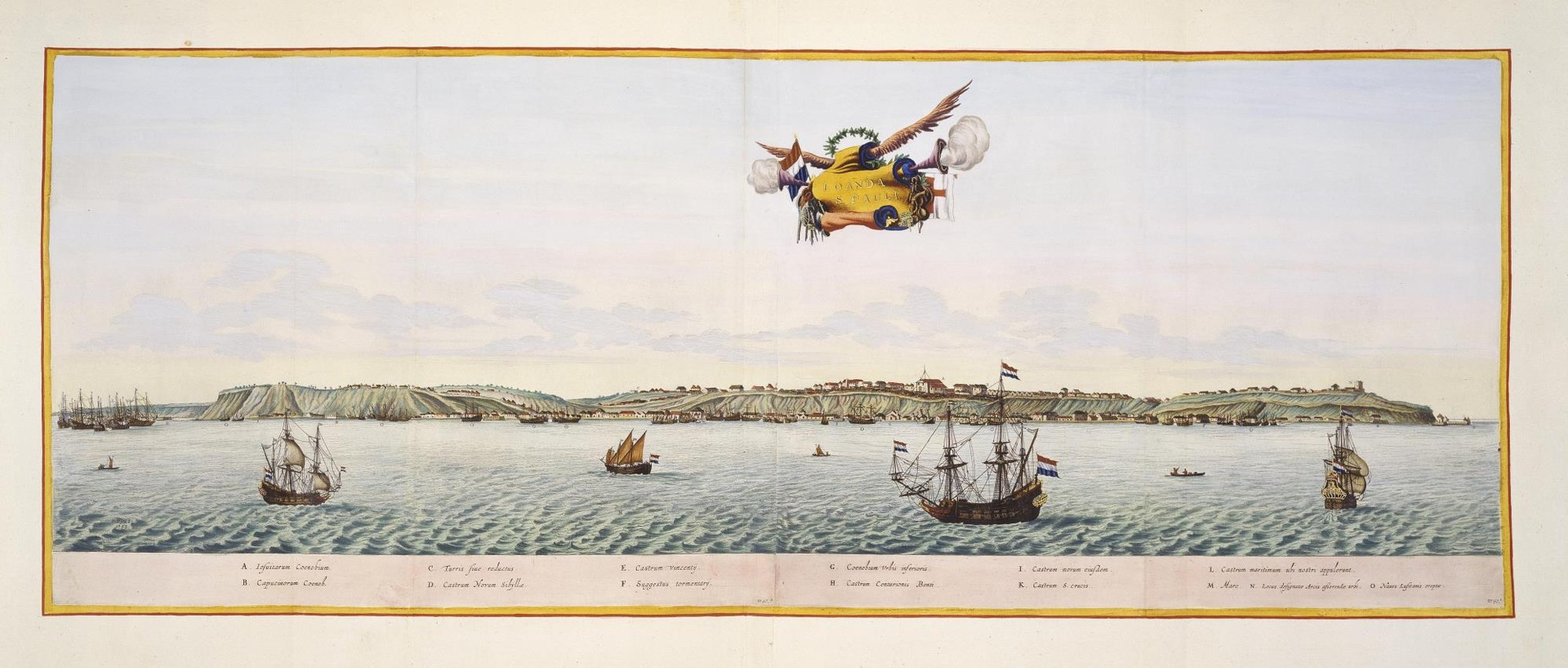
View of Luanda.

The new Dutch director at Luanda Cornelis Ouwman once more broke the truce with the Portuguese and attacked them. After this incident, Souto-Maior was quoted as saying that "I do not fear all the power of Holland! The Fleming shall fear me!" Yet he decided to focus on Nzinga first. With the assistance of king Filipe of Ndongo and the Imbangala, the Portuguese routed Queen Nzinga at the Battle of Kavanga in March 1646, with 16 horsemen, 330 Portuguese infantrymen and over 20,000 African auxiliaries, among Ambundu archers, Imbangala mercenaries and empacasseiros buffalo-hunters. Nzinga escaped once again but she was forced to withdraw to Matamba, while the Portuguese captured her sister, Dona Bárbara. Despite this defeat, Nzinga refused peace negotiations.

Souto-Maior died from an unknown disease on 19 May while he was preparing a campaign against the Dutch, and was replaced with an elected council led by Bartolomeu de Vasconcelos da Cunha, António de Teixeira de Mendonça and João Zuzarte de Andrade, who decided to employ their resources elsewhere. As supplies at Massangano were running low, António Teixeira de Mendonça led a force to try and open up a pathway to the sea, but they were repulsed by the Dutch near the Lucala. Over the next two years the Portuguese suffered great hardship isolated in the interior and on 25 November 1647 they were routed at the Battle of Kombi by a coalition of forces of Queen Nzinga and the Dutch. A Dutch-Matamba force led by Thijmen Pietersen scored followed with another victory in August 1648. Nzinga pressed on and encircled the three Portuguese strongholds of Ambaca, Massangano and Muxima. The staunch support of Filipe of Ndongo and his thousands of warriors allowed the Portuguese to resist.

=== Portuguese restoration of Angola, 1648-1656 ===
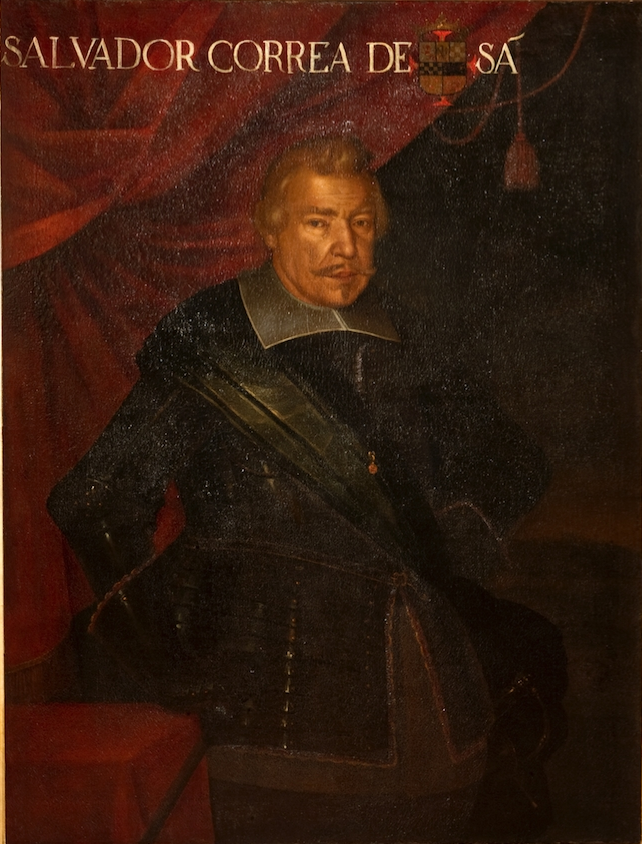
Salvador Correia de Sá.

Just as Portuguese fortunes seemed at their lowest in Angola, a Portuguese fleet of 11 ships and 1100 men dispatched from Lisbon and commanded by Salvador Correia de Sá recaptured Luanda on 21 August 1648, after a brief action. Sá's rapid recapture of Luanda was due to ‘his uncompromising and disruptive tactics, the enemy's lack of command and the markedly mercenary character of Dutch troops, indignant at poor pay’. The Dutch surrender was another breach of terms, this time with Queen Nzinga, as the company was not allowed to negotiate with the Portuguese without first consulting her. The two WIC directors Lems and Ouwman do not appear to have taken Nzinga or any of their allies in consideration while in negotiation with Salvador de Sá, but aid had not reached Luanda from the Netherlands as the Dutch Estates-General had been divided on this issue and the garrison was demoralized. Most of the Dutch troops were away fighting alongside the forces of Nzinga and when they returned on August 27 the city had already returned to Portuguese control. Although the Dutch controlled the hinterland of Luanda, commander Thijmen Pietersen accepted the capitulation and he embarked on Portuguese ships with his men, while Nzingas forces were left behind.

After the recapture of Luanda, Nzinga lifted the sieges of Ambaca, Muxima and Massangano and withdrew her forces to Matamba. Kalunga of Kasanje also renewed the relationship with Luanda that had strengthened in the previous war years.

Still in 1648, Salvador Correia de Sá brought all the sobas still loyal to the Dutch back under Portuguese fold, began pacifying others who remained hostile to Portugal and signed a peace with Kasanje. He did not however agree to a peace with Queen Nzinga, as she demanded the return of her sister Bárbara, kept in Luanda as a valuable prisoner.

Difficult campaigns to the region of Sumbes and the Mabus Islands followed, lasting from 1648 to 1649. In January 1649, a short campaign up the Kwanza river on canoes succeeded in driving away hostile lords that had settled along its banks and preyed on river navigation.

Two months later, Salvador Correia de Sá dispatched captain-major Jorge da Silva with a force of 400 soldiers and thousands of African auxiliaries to Ambuíla and the Dembos, whose sobas had been attacking Portuguese traders and merchant caravans. This campaign resulted in the construction of a stockade fort with a large moat on the left bank of the Dande River and the recapture of the Dembos, among other things.

Realizing the impossibility of marching on Luanda due to the Portuguese troops stationed on the Dande, Garcia II of Kongo accepted peace and on 13 April 1649 he signed a treaty with Salvador Correia de Sá, in which the Portuguese returned the Dembos in exchange for a mining concession in the same region, among other things. Kongo lost the Island of Luanda, and with it their supply of nzimbu shells, used as currency.

Though peace was nominally settled with Kongo, war against Nzinga continued. Many sobas and Imbangalas became disaffected with the Portuguese after losing fertile land along the Dande, Zenza and Cuanza and Nzinga welcomed them into her ranks. The Imbangala warlord Kabuku Kandonga II made a secret arrangement to join Nzinga and in early 1654 the queen sent him emissaries, but the Portuguese learnt of the plan and captured him the following year. Though the Portuguese defeated Kabuku ka Ndonga, his lieutenant became a regular part of Nzingas army. Governor Luís Martins de Sousa Chichorro organized a major campaign against soba Kambambe, one of Nzingas former allies who had reemerged as a major threat . Operations in Quissama continued for the following eighteen months, with major casualties. The Imbangala warlord Kalandula was implicated in the plot to join Nzinga, but he evaded capture and joined Nzinga with 1000 warriors.

=== Peace with Nzinga, 1656 ===
Nzinga was also at war with Kasanje, with whom Luanda had established friendly ties in 1638. Kasanje had never fought in Portugals wars but the Portuguese hoped to use it against Nzinga along with the forces of Filipe of Ndongo. Furthermore, Nzinga sought to reclaim Ndongo as well as to settle her succession, as she feared that Nzinga Mona might replace her on the throne of Matamba with the support of the Imbangala, who made up a large and distinct part of her army. In order to do this she sought peace with Portugal and a return to Catholicism. As early as 1648 she had captured Kongo priest Calixto Zelotes dos Reis Magos during an attack on Wandu, which led her to request missionaries, and had already begun the process of peace in 1654. She consulted with a group of xingula mediums and they agreed that she was free to become a Christian as it would bring peace.

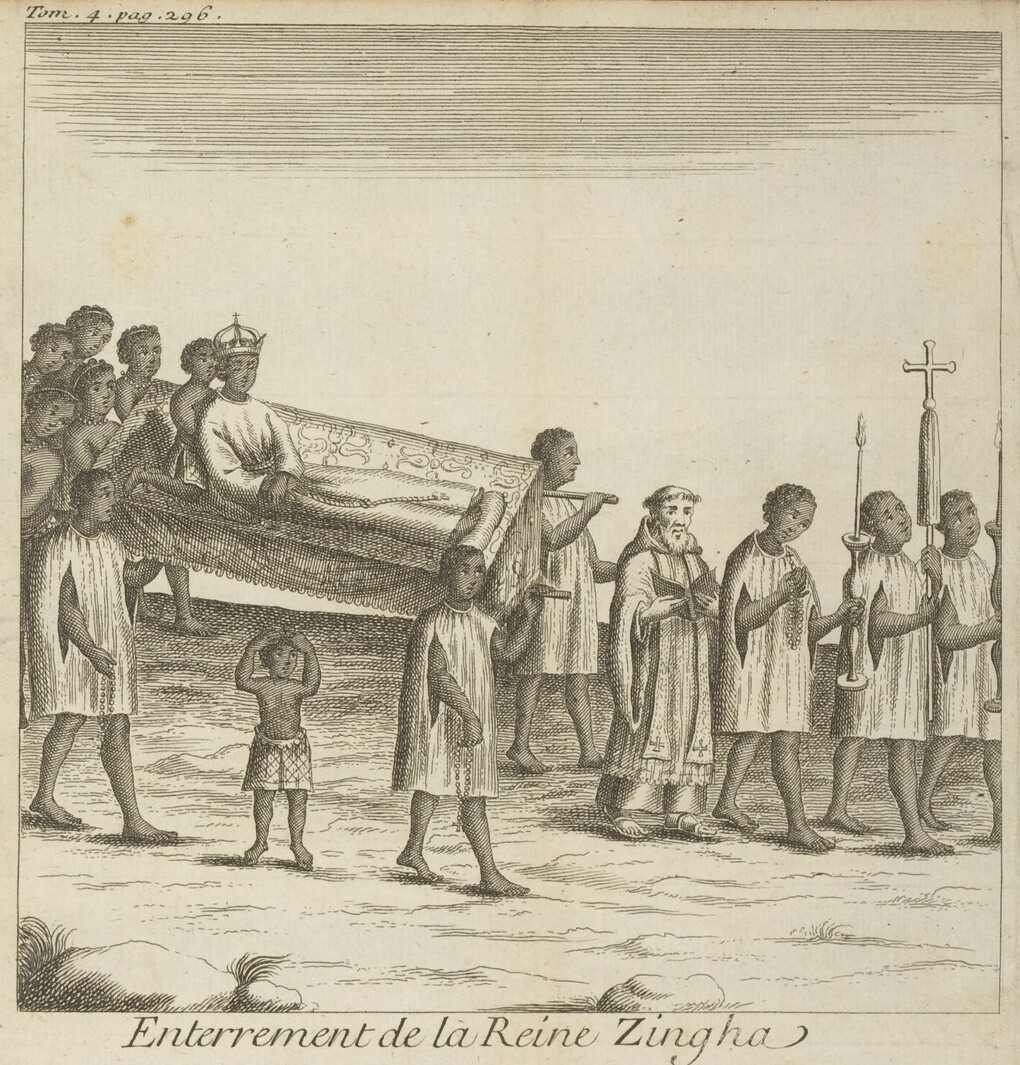
The funeral procession of Queen Nzinga.

As part of negotiations, Nzinga offered to support the Portuguese in their ongoing war in Kisama as a replacement for king Filipe. Governor Sousa Chichorro returned Nzingas sister Bárbara as a token of good faith, and following an embassy from the queen, a formal treaty was signed on 12 October 1656. She abandoned her claims to the strategic Dembos region, on the trade route leading west from Matamba to the sea, which she had fought over ten years to control, opened Matamba to Portuguese traders, granted free passage to Kasanje, allowed a Portuguese resident at her capital, committed to the payment of an annual tribute and to provide military assistance. The terms granted Nzinga a monopoly of slave exports, and assured her of Portuguese support. Nzinga renounced Imbangala rites and surrendered the Imbangala band of Kalandula, while the Portuguese agreed not to support Imbangala claims to her throne.

Following the end of negotiations, Nzinga had her army assemble with drums beating and flags flying in front of a church on 31 January 1657 to announce the peace. She was brought an armchair to sit on and review the troops but she stood upon it and thrusting a bow in the air shouted: "Who can ever defeat this bow? Only Maniputo, king of Portugal can defeat it, now I say to all of you that I have just made peace with him, and I do not want to go about in the bush anymore as I have done up to now, now it is time that I leave this bow" and threw it on the ground. She claimed to desire peace due to her age and thanked the warriors for their hardships suffered in wars.

Nzingas reconciliation resulted from renewed Portuguese strength and how unwillingly her Ambundu subjects had accepted her authority, while a return to Christianity afforded her Portuguese contacts and protection, not just from without, but from within as well. To the very end, Nzingas subjects of traditional Ambundu noble lineages never accepted her as anything more than regent, but as a Catholic the Portuguese supported her rule over Matamba. She subsequently devoted significant efforts to building churches and encouraging missionary work in her kingdom. She wrote to the Pope asking for recognition, which she obtained. While the treaty brought peace with Portugal, war with Kasanje would continue until 1662. Nzingas "nearly twenty-five years of implacable hostility dissolved after 1650 in a subservience that became the cornerstone of her diplomacy until the end of her life in 1663".

== Civil-war in Kongo, the end of Ndongo and the submission of Matamba, 1656-1683 ==
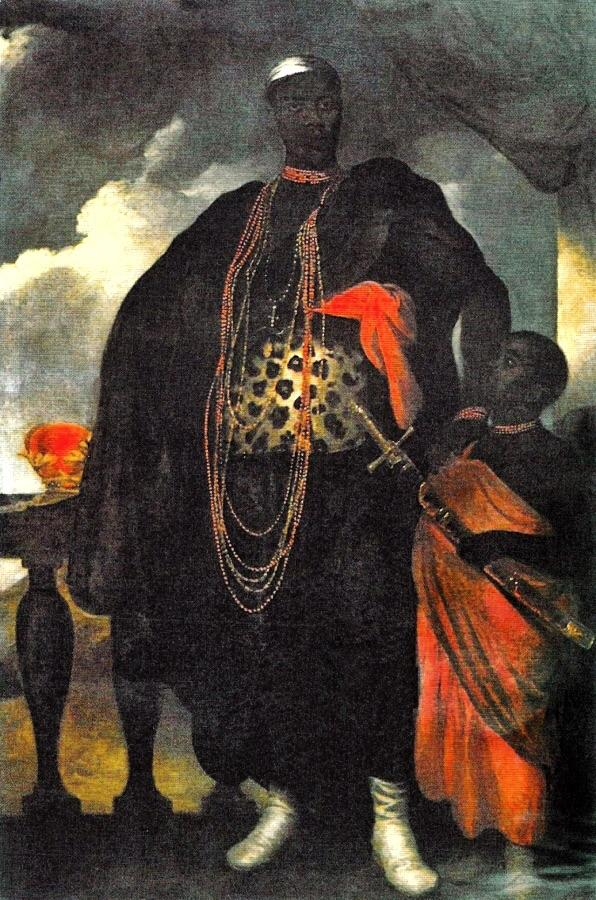
King Garcia II of Kongo.

King Garcia refused to comply with the peace treaty, charged heavy taxes on Portuguese merchants, and he harassed Portuguese merchants and Capuchin friars in Kongo, which strained relations with Luanda.

Kongo was by then already embroiled in civil war between King Garcia, the count of Soyo and the Marquis of Pemba. When a request for help from the Marquis of Pemba reached Luanda, governor Luís Martins de Sousa Chichorro declared war on Kongo on 9 June 1657. Kongo was by then weakened due to internal strife and the Luso-African army commanded by Diogo Gomes de Morales inflicted a defeat on the marquis of Manilumbo. They reached as far as the city of Bamba but at that point the troops refused to march beyond the River Loge as they believed it was the legendary "river of forgetfulness" and anyone who would cross it would never return. Furthermore, the Marquis of Pemba was found to have already been executed. When an envoy from King Garcia reached Luanda promising to comply with the treaty, the governor had the army withdrawn.

That same year, the king of Kasanje converted and adopted the name Pascoal Rodrigues Machado, however, none of his subjects agreed to follow Christian rites aside from the Portuguese merchants in his kingdom.

The following year during the tenure of governor João Fernandes Vieira, Bartolomeu Vasconcelos da Cunha moved to subsue the notorious Quissama lord Angolomem-a-Caita in 1658, with an army of around 400 soldiers and thousands of auxiliaries led by king Filipe of Ndongo and the Imbangala warlord Kabuku. In the region of Axila, within the district of Massangano, Angolomem-a-Caita ordered a retreat to heavily fortified strongholds and the campaign degenerated into a series of lengthy siege operations. After six months, the besieged surrendered, severely weakened by famine.

A new religious mission to Kasanje in 1660 yielded no results. The missionary Giovanni Cavazzi da Montecuccolo encouraged the authorities of Kasanje to ban infanticide, cannibalism, human sacrifice and expel the traditional shamans but the imbangala elite refused to, aside from banning cannibalism in times of peace. King Pascoal Machado told Cavazzi that "we conquered these provinces of Ganguela and others without this Zambi of yours called Deus and without Him we shall do the same in the future as we have done in the past."

=== The Battle of Ambuíla ===
King Garcia did not follow through with his promises and he died in 1660. He was succeeded by António I, who likewise refused provide access to mines or pay tribute. He also entered talks with Spain seeking an alliance and the support of a Spanish fleet to invade Portuguese Angola.

In late 1664, a succession dispute broke out in the Dembos and king António evicted the regent of Bamba-Ambuíla Dona Isabel along with the lord of Ambuíla, both of whom then turned to the Portuguese. They provided Luanda with letters revealing that António was preparing to block roads and instigate a revolt in Portuguese Angola. Subsequently, governor André Vidal de Negreiros declared war on Kongo and dispatched an army to the Dembos with orders to reinstate the ousted rulers.

Portuguese battle-standard with the Cross of the Order of Christ.

At the Battle of Ambuíla full military capacity was displayed by both sides but the Portuguese were better equipped and more experienced as they and the Imbangala had been almost continuously on campaign since 1648. The larger royal army of Kongo was catastrophically routed, and king António himself fell in combat leading a frontal assault against the gun-lines of the Portuguese infantry square. The silver crown and scepter of the king of Kongo were taken as war-trophies, as was his severed head, which was buried at Luanda with great pomp.

The Battle of Ambuíla is the most famous of the set piece battles of conquest in West Central Africa. It had profound repercussions, as it aggravated the civil war in Kongo, which would last for another five decades and launch the kingdom on a spiral of decline from which it would never recover.

=== The Battle of Quitombo ===
In 1670, the Count of Sonyo Dom Estevão da Silva deposed Rafael I of Kongo, who then appealed to Luanda for military aid. Rafael offered Luanda money, mineral concessions and authorization to build a fort in Soyo to keep out the Dutch. In June, governor Francisco de Távora dispatched the Luso-African army composed of 400 musketeers, a detachment of horsemen, artillery, contingents of Imbangala mercenaries and Ambundo auxiliaries. The Portuguese scored a victory against Soyo at the Battle of Ambriz in June.

At the Battle of Kitombo however, the Portuguese were routed by the Count of Sonyo's troops, now equipped with firearms supplied by the Dutch West India Company.

=== The annexation of Ndongo ===
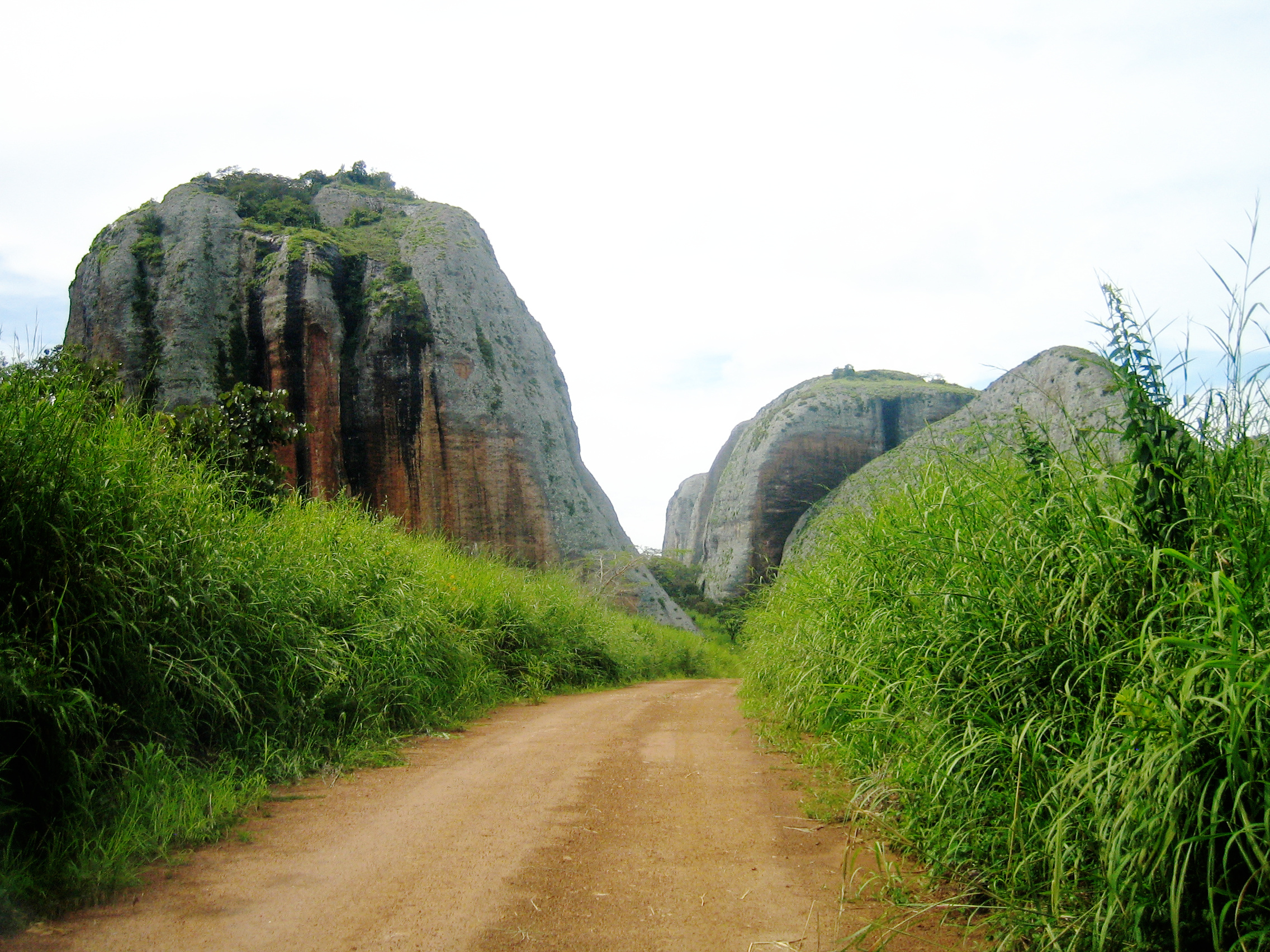
The Black Stones of Pungo Andongo.

King João Hari had succeeded on the throne of Ndongo ever since the death of king Filipe de Sousa of Ndongo in 1664. After the Battle of Kitombo, king António Carrasco of Matamba persuaded João Hari to turn on the Portuguese, cut off communications between Luanda and the kingdom of Kasanje and attack their merchant caravans. King João was encouraged by his brother Dom Diogo, chief-commander of his army, who incited neighbouring lords to revolt against the Portuguese and unite under his banner "with his natural and excessive ferociousness and intrepity" according to a report to Lisbon.

Governor Francisco de Távora reacted swiftly to the debacle in Quitombo and the about-face in Ndongo, requesting reinforcements from Portuguese Brazil and dispatching a small contingent in advance to the fortress of Ambaca on the frontier. The Portuguese skirmished with the warriors of Ndongo even before the arrival of substantial reinforcements from Brazil. A great number of Imbangala mercenaries from the garrisons of Ilamba, Lumbo, Massangano, Cambambe, Muxima and elsewhere were assembled. It was the largest campaign undertaken by the Portuguese until that point.

The Portuguese army left Ambaca on 2 August under the command of Luís Lopes de Sequeira, who had previously distinguished himself at the Battle of Ambuíla. Ndongo warriors skirmished with the Portuguese army on the march in an effort to stop it from reaching the capital, Pungo Andongo. Sequeira however managed to set up a fortified camp nearby and sieged it. On 27 August, the Portuguese repulsed a strong attack on their lines led by Dom Diogo. After a three-month siege, the Portuguese commander decided to storm Pungo Andongo when news arrived that Matamba was preparing a relief army to aid besieged. On the night of 18 November 1671, the town was stormed and captured. The entire royal family of Ndongo was also captured. King João Hari tried to flee but he was captured by a hostile lord, delivered to the Portuguese and beheaded. Some of the prisoners were protected from captivity by prior agreements, which the Portuguese respected. The kingdom of Ndongo was thus dissolved and its territory annexed to Portuguese Angola.

Throughout all of 1679 Luís Lopes de Sequeira distinguished himself commanding operations against the Kingdom of Libolo south of Kwanza, which was also annexed.

=== The submission of Matamba ===
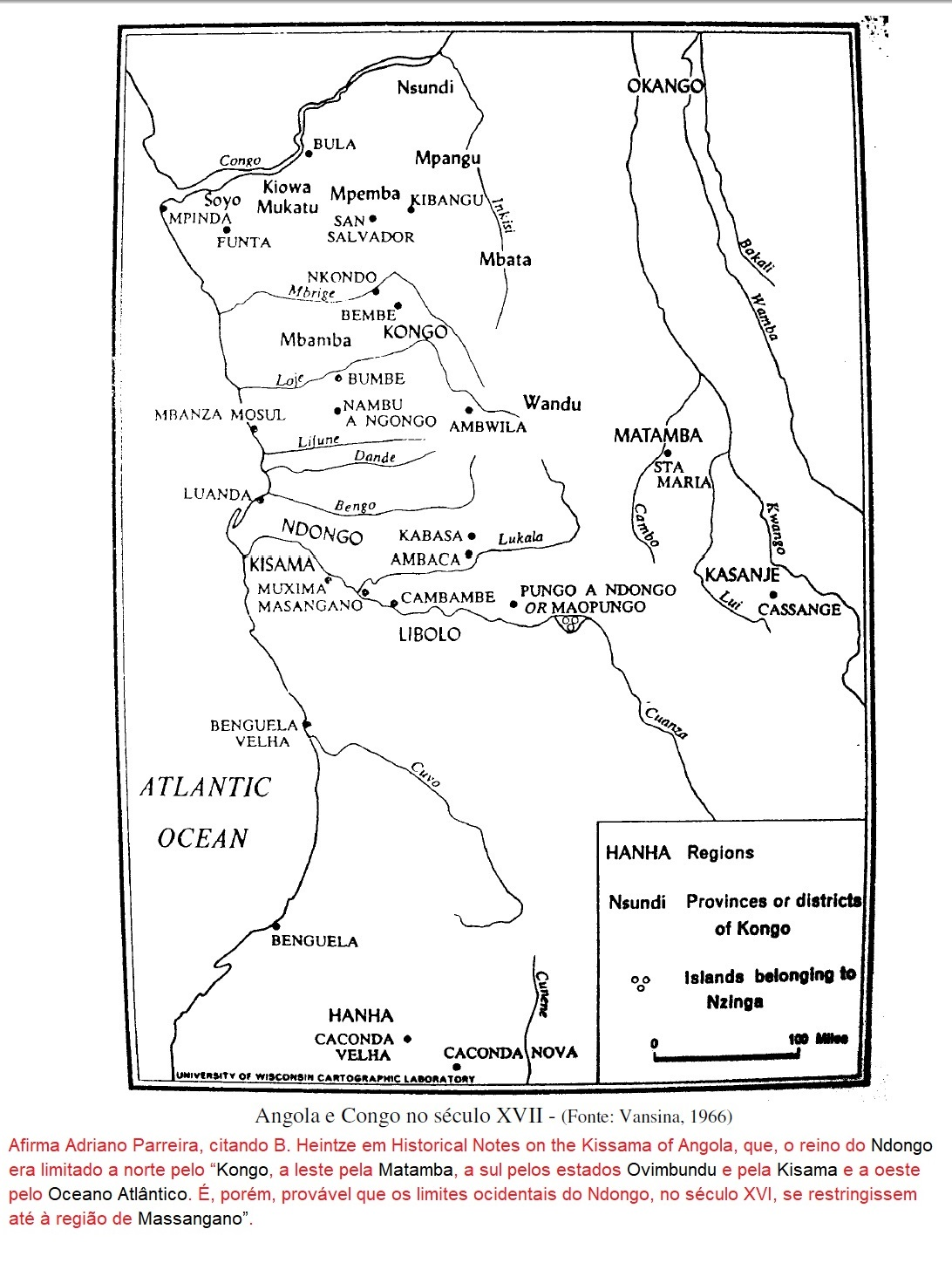
The region of Angola.

When Nzinga died she was succeeded in Matamba by her sister Bárbara, who supported Christianity but her husband António Carrasco Njinga a Mona defended Imbangala tradition. He usurped the throne and violently persecuted several political rivals. Horrified by the brutality of Carrasco, queen Bárbara herself fled from the capital but died shortly afterwards. Carrasco was in turn beheaded in 1674 by a rival, Dom Francisco Guterres, who took the throne with Portuguese support.

Governor João da Silva e Sousa however wished to develop trade with the Lunda Empire further east and so he favoured relations with the kingdom of Kasanje, through which Portuguese trade caravans would have to pass. Resentful of this, in 1680 king Francisco allied with a rebellious lord of Kasanje, attacked the kingdom and raided Portuguese caravans. King Pascoal Machado of Kasanje died shortly after repelling a Matamba incursion but as the election for his successor was disputed, civil-war erupted. Matamba forcibly placed Luís Ndala Kingo a Hanga on the throne but he was overthrown by Kinguri Kia Kasanje in a counter-rebellion soon after the withdrawal of king Francisco and his troops from Kasanje. The governor of Angola João da Silva e Sousa declared war on Matamba in August 1681 and dispatched a 40,000 men army which was joined by Kinguri kia Kasanje.

At the Battle of Katole, the Portuguese were ambushed and Sequeira was assassinated by a Portuguese soldier, but the Portuguese officers managed to rally the troops and secure victory through a counter-attack. King Francisco also died in battle and was succeeded by his sister Verónica Guterres, who signed a pact of vassalage to Portugal two years later on 7 September 1683, in effect putting an end to the Angolan Wars.

== Aftermath ==
Portuguese territory in Angola.

The Angolan Wars had a profound impact in the region. The Kongo descended into civil-war, Ndongo was annexed and relations between Portugal and the kingdoms of Kasanje and Matamba were henceforth managed through trade agreements. Ndongo was the first African kingdom to be annexed by Europeans. Kongo suffered a severe demographic loss as a result of conflict and civil-war, as did Ndongo, which was annexed by Portugal. Popular memory of the depredations of the cannibal Imbangala in particular lingered long in Kongo.

The victories of captain-major Luís Lopes de Sequeira at Ambuíla in 1665, Ndongo in 1671, Libolo in 1679 and Katole in 1681, decisively broke the resistance of the African kingdoms and paved the way for the gradual expansion of Portuguese influence north of the Central Angolan Plateau. Conflict in Angola did not cease entirely after the peace with Matamba in 1683 but it subsided greatly. Although the region around Luanda remained unstable, major campaigns became rare in Ambundu country and Portuguese governors increasingly limited their concerns to civil matters, such as municipal architecture or trade litigation. They continued however in the hinterland of Benguela further to the south, where the Portuguese got involved in a series of important conflicts over trade routes to the Ovimbundu highlands. The focus of trade also shifted further inland into the Lunda Empire, at the time engaged in its own expansionist wars, making Kasanje and Benguela important middle-men and transit points for Portuguese trade caravans.

The Portuguese Crown enforced a strict policy of trade and non-intervention. When governor João da Silva e Sousa handed the government of Angola to Luís Lobo da Silva, in 1684, the Portuguese "could apparently look forward with confidence to a period of easy prosperity after the arduous wars of the past 100 years." However, commercial competition with rival European powers such as France, the Netherlands and England would become Portugal's main concern in the region until the Campaigns of Pacification and Occupation, over 150 years later.

== See also ==
- Thirty Years' War
- Portuguese Angola
- List of Ngolas of Ndongo
- List of rulers of Matamba

== Bibliography ==
- Ralph Delgado: História de Angola, Banco de Angola, 1973–1978.
- Alberto Oliveira Pinto: História de Angola: Da Pré-História ao Início do Séc. XXI, Mercado de Letras Editores, 2019.
- André Murteira, Hélder Carvalhal, Roger Lee de Jesus: The First World Empire: Portugal, War and Military Revolution, Taylor & Francis, 2021.
