= Cuanza River Campaign =

15th Century Portuguese campaign in Angola

- Part of the Angolan Wars
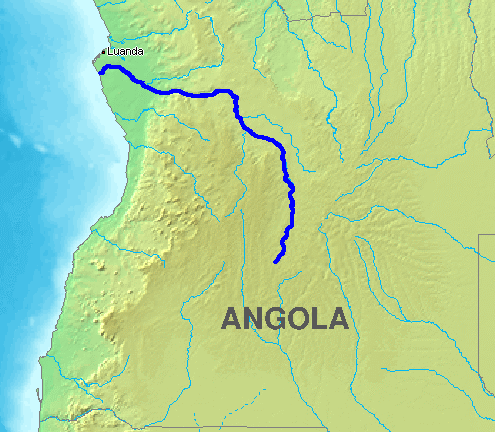
- Cuanza River
Date	May 1580 – November 1, 1582
Location	Along the Cuanza River, Angola
Result	Inconclusive

Belligerents
Kingdom of Portugal; Supported by: Kingdom of Kongo	Kingdom of Ndongo; Ambundu

Commanders and leaders
Paulo Dias de Novais; Baltasar Barreira	Ngola

Strength
290–300 soldiers 2 galleys 1 caravel Several smaller vessels	Unknown

Casualties and losses
Two-thirds of the 300 soldiers killed by disease	Many thousands killed

The Cuanza River Campaign was a military campaign between the Kingdom of Portugal (supported by the Kingdom of Kongo), the Kingdom of Ndongo, and the Ambundu.

== Background ==
Previously, Paulo Dias de Novais had won a siege in Anzele led by the Ngola forces, consisting of 12,000 men. After the siege, the Ngola warriors sought to make peace with the governor, which he declined, as he already planned to attack them again with a larger force, with the support of the king of Congo.

In May 1580, Paulo Dias de Novais organized an expedition along the Cuanza River, deploying 290-300 soldiers, along with two small ships and several smaller vessels. The purpose was to achieve a quick conquest that would open the way to the supposed Cambambe mines.

== Campaign ==
Despite initial successes, Paulo Dias de Novais soon faced problems such as diseases, bad weather, and resistance. Father Barreira in Luanda, upon learning of the governor's difficulties, set out on his way to the capital of the Kongo on September 24, 1580, to remind the king's promise and to hasten the arrival of his help.

Meanwhile, due to lack of supplies, the soldiers began to loot everything they found, leaving everyone frightened. This created fear and some sobas came to ally themselves with the Portuguese, one of them was Mushima Quitangombe. And they advanced with the Cambambe mines as their goal. On November 1, 1580, they arrived near Cambambe. The Portuguese troops camped in Mocumbe for two years, during which two-thirds of the 300 soldiers died, largely due to illness.

== Bibliography ==
- Sacra, Lusitania (1993). Lusitania Sacra - 2a Série - Tomo 5 (1993). Centro de Estudos de História Religiosa.
