= Kabuku ka Ndonga =

Kabuku ka Ndonga was a 17th century Imbangala warlord. Referred to by the Portuguese as Jaga Cabuco, He distinguished himself in the Angolan Wars as one of the most resolute allies of Portugal.

== Life ==
After the Dutch West India Company captured Luanda from Portugal in 1641, most Portuguese residents abandoned the city and moved inland to the strongholds of Ambaca, Cambambe and Massangano, from which they continued to resist against not just the Dutch, but Queen Nzinga and the Kingdom of Kongo. Cut-off from the sea, they made or renewed treaties of alliances with the surrounding African rulers. Kabuku Kandonga, leader of an Imbangala war-band, was one of them.

He fought for the Portuguese against the Dutch West India Company and against Pangi a Ndona. In 1644 Kabuku was captured in battle by Queen Nzinga when he attempted to siege the mountain hideout of the tribal lord Ngolem a Keta, an ally of Nzinga, but she set him free as she had taken an Imbangala oath which prohibited an Imbangala leader from killing a fellow leader. Kabuku however considered himself a true Imbangala and had more prestige among many Imbangala than Nzinga did, who was seen as an upstart. For that reason, he promptly rejoined the side of the Portuguese after regaining freedom.

He was succeeded by Kabuku ka Ndonga II, who plotted to defect to the side of Nzinga with his forces in early 1654, but the Portuguese authorities in Luanda learnt of the scheme and captured him in 1655. His lieutenant Kalandula still managed to join Nzingas army with 1000 warriors.

== See also ==
- History of Angola
- Portuguese Angola
