= Battle of Casicola =

- Part of the Angolan Wars
Date	25 August 1585
Location	Casicola, Angola
Result	Portuguese victory.

Belligerents
Portugal	Kingdom of Ndongo

Commanders and leaders
(Portugal) André Ferreira Pereira	Andala Quitunga

Strength
130 Portuguese soldiers 8,000 Ambundu auxiliaries	6,000-12,000

Casualties and losses
None	Heavy

The battle of Casicola was an armed engagement between Portugal and the Kingdom of Ndongo on August 24, 1585, during the Angolan Wars. It resulted in an important Portuguese victory, that was decisive to the control the region around Luanda.

== History ==
In 1585, the Portuguese were committed to the first war against the Kingdom of Ndongo, after king Kia Kasenda had massacred the Portuguese merchant community in his capital six years prior. Ever since then, numerous Ndongo tribal lords or sobas had defected as Kia Kasenda had usurped his throne and his rule was not uncontested, besides that his violent persecution of political rivals drew many to the side of the Portuguese.

Once the dry cacimbo ("fog") season had set in in July of that year, the Portuguese resumed operations on the field. 140 Portuguese soldiers skirmished continuously against the forces of Ndongo, while less than 160 were stationed at various forts created throughout the hinterland of Luanda by Paulo Dias de Novais, to support the field army. The Portuguese were aided by 10,000 Ambundu quimbares auxiliaries, who fought as bowmen, many of whom had converted to Catholicism.

Kia Kasenda evacuated his capital of Kabasa that month and constructed five timber and thatch stockades. The following month in August, a Christian Ambundu prince Andala Quitunga offered to destroy the Portuguese for Kia Kasenda in exchange for an army. The ngola provided him with a large army, among which were 40 arquebusiers.

Paulo Dias de Novais was then at the Portuguese inland stronghold of Massangano, but Andala Quitunga instead sought the field army of captain-major André Ferreira Pereira, who was then camped in Ilamba, conducting operations with 130 Portuguese soldiers and 8,000-10,000 auxiliaries.

=== The battle ===
Portuguese battle-standard featuring the Cross of the Order of Christ.

Informed of the force heading towards him, Ferreira Pereira decided to march out and meet it. The forces of Ndongo marched spread out over a league and a half to two leangues or perhaps eight kilometers. Ferreira Pereira spent the night of August 24 on a careful march towards the hostile army, and early on the morning of the following day arrayed themselves to battle, in the midst of thick fog.

Fearing that the Portuguese might break through his vanguard, Andala Quitunga divided his forces in three squadrons, one after the other, with the best of the Ndongo nobility in the front. Nevertheless, the heavily armed and armoured Portuguese fell upon the enemy army with a vigorous frontal charge accompanied by the auxiliaries, with which they not only shattered the Ndongo vanguard but the two following squadrons that marched out to meet them as well.

The aggressiveness of the veteran Portuguese soldiers in the melée earned them the nickname sambas, meaning "elephants" in a local dialect, as "wherever they move towards, nobody stops in front of them" according to a contemporary account. The heavy fog was also vital at Casicola as it not only prevented the auxiliaries from realizing the enemy numbers, which was critical in keeping them in the fight, but it also hid the strength of the Portuguese from the Ndongo, who believed they were fighting a much larger force.

The Portuguese killed or captured a considerable part of the Ndongo nobility at Casicola. Portuguese casualties numbered only some wounded.

=== Aftermath ===
The victory at Casicola was described as a "great miracle" by the Portuguese at the time, because much of Ndongos nobility was defeated at the battle. After Casicola, many hostile sobas of Ilamba switched sides and thus a level of peace fell on the region around Luanda, benefitting the Portuguese administration.

Novais took the opportunity to seize the fabled mines of Cambambe and had João Castanho de Velês march out at the head of a force to the region. However, Velês was ambushed while leading a foraging party and he was massacred almost to a man in the region of Musseque. Afterwards, the remaining of his forces returned to Massangano.

The massacre of Castanho de Velês caused many sobas to suddenly waver in their loyalty to Portugal and so Paulo Dias de Novais decided to gather a large force to conduct a punitive expedition personally.

Meanwhile, Kia Kasenda also decided to take the field at the head of his forces against the Portuguese upon hearing of the rout of Castanho Velês. He gathered his army in utmost secrecy. Notwithstanding his precautions, he was in turn ambushed by the Portuguese by the river Lucala on September 13, 1586, and suffered a strong defeat while trying to ferry his forces across.

== See also ==
- Portuguese Angola
- Siege of Anzele
