= Siege of Anzele =

1579 siege

- Part of the Angolan Wars
Date	1579
Location	Anzele, Angola
Result	Portuguese victory.

Belligerents
Portugal	Kingdom of Ndongo

Commanders and leaders
(Portugal) Paulo Dias de Novais	Kia Kasenda

Strength
150-260 men	12,000 men

Casualties and losses
Unknown	Unknown

The siege of Anzele was an armed operation between Portugal and the Kingdom of Ndongo, in 1579, and the first military action of the Angolan Wars, which would then continue for over a century.

== History ==
In 1576, the Portuguese explorer Paulo Dias de Novais signed a trade and military alliance with the ngola or king of Ndongo, Nzinga Ngola Kilombo Kia Kasenda and founded the city of Luanda. Relations between Ndongo and Portugal were so amicable that Kia Kasenda requested an ambassador for his capital of Kabasa and Novais dispatched his familiar Pero da Fonseca with a guard of 20 men for the task. Yet Novais was considered an unwelcome intruder by the numerous freelance Portuguese merchants already established in the region, and some sought to disrupt their relations.

At Kabasa, Fonseca quarreled with the influential trader Francisco Barbudo d'Aguiar, who then persuaded Kia Kasenda that Novais intended to conquer his kingdom. After consulting with his advisors therefore, Kia Kasenda decided to have all Portuguese in his realm massacred, Barbudo included because the king believed that "it was not right that one should live who had caused the death of his countrymen". About 30 to 40 Portuguese were killed at Kabasa, plus a number more throughout the kingdom, and their property seized, along with 1000-2000 Christian African slaves. A further 1000 kongo then at Kabasa were also murdered, which damaged relations with the Kingdom of Kongo. Kia Kasenda then began assembling an army to destroy Luanda.

Novais was then camped with his troops by the banks of the Cuanza at a location identified as the Rocha de São Pedro or Saint Peters Outcrop, upstream from Santa Cruz. He received a messenger from the ngola demanding him not to advance no further into Ndongo. Unaware of the events at Kabasa but suspicious, Novais relocated with his men to Anzele, about 50 kilometers away from Luanda, between the rivers Cuanza and Bengo, in the region of Ilamba, near Caxito.

At Anzele, the Novais had a simple timber fort built, equipped with two cannon. Twenty days later, news arrived of the massacre at Kabasa and of the approach of the Ndongo army, 12,000 men strong. Far from being discouraged, Novais inspired his men with the hope of avenging the massacre. The garrison numbered 150 men according to some sources, 60 Portuguese and 200 Africans according to others.

The fort was attacked by the Ambundu, but they suffered unexpected losses from artillery fire in the assault. When one of the Ndongo commanders was killed by a cannonball they immediately scattered in a disorganized rout. Seeing the confusion, Novais had sergeant-major Manuel João conduct a sally and chase the fleeing enemies throughout the countryside. Manuel João killed or captured many, along with plentiful supplies from the enemy camp.

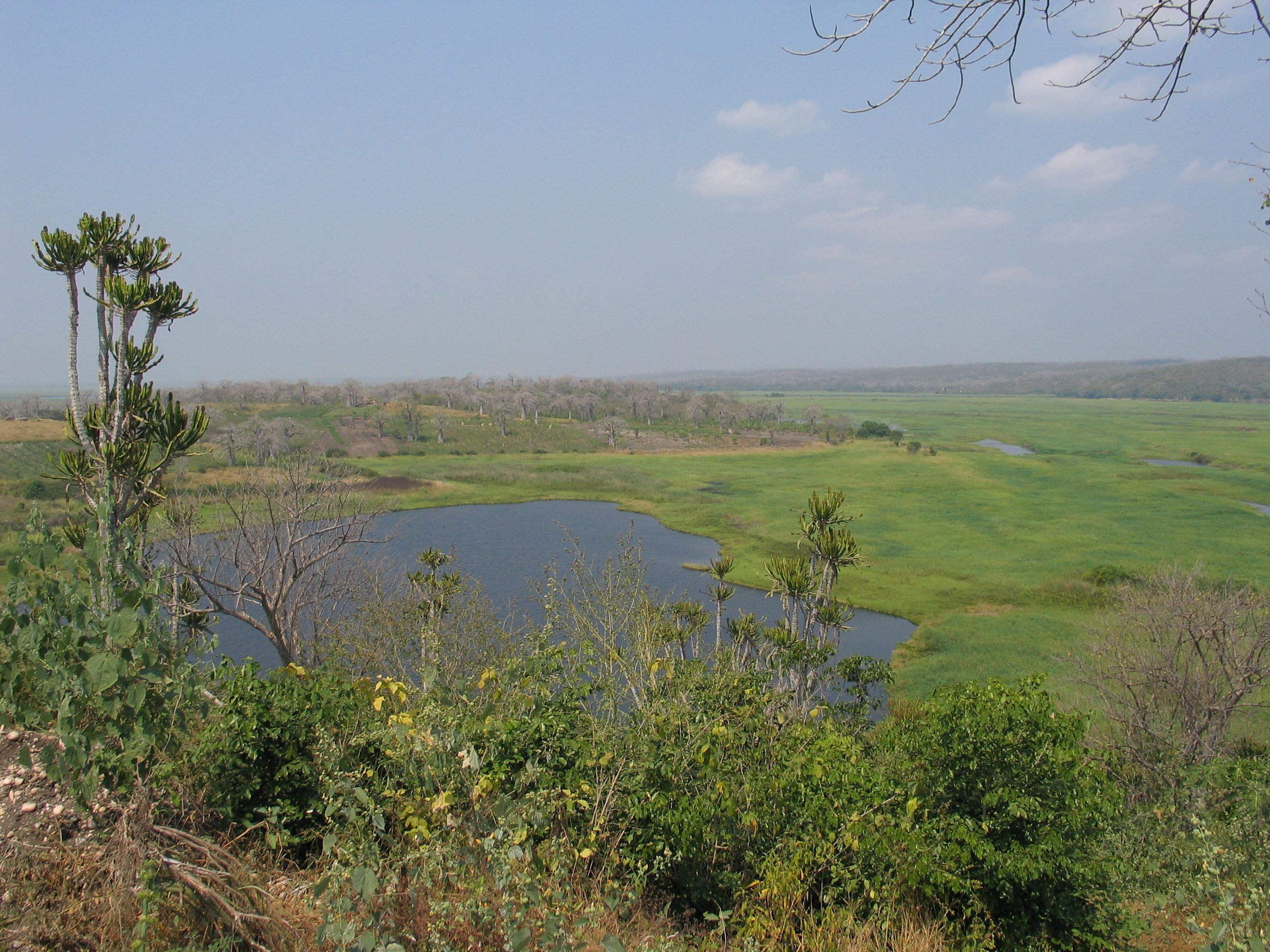
Geography of the region between the Cuanza and Bengo, at Cacefo, in Icolo e Bengo Province.

The debacle at Anzele promptly cause the ngola to ask for peace, but Novais denounced him and rejected terms. Afterwards the king of Ndongo executed all of his advisors who had encouraged him to war.

Meanwhile, a fleet arrived at Luanda with a reinforcement of 200 soldiers, commanded by Diogo Rodrigues dos Colos and they marched out to Anzele. Novais decided to return to the Cuanza and initiate a campaign against Ndongo up the river. He also received support from Ambundu tribal lords who were hostile to the ruling ngola and switched their allegiance to Portugal.

The march to the Cuanza had however to be forced through four roadblocks made by four Ndongo lords, but they were overcome and large quantities of supplies captured by the Portuguese along the way.

== See also ==
- History of Angola
- Cuanza River Campaign
