= Bento Banha Cardoso =

Governor of Portuguese Angola
- In office April 15, 1611 – 1615
- Monarch: King Philip II
- Preceded by: Manuel Pereira Forjaz
- Succeeded by: Manuel Cerveira Pereira
- In office 1611–1615

Personal details
- Died: August 1628

Military service
- Allegiance: (Portugal) Portuguese Empire

Bento Banha Cardoso was a 17th-century Portuguese officier and interim governor of Angola between 1611 and 1615. He was preceded by Manuel Pereira Forjaz and succeeded by Manuel Cerveira Pereira.

== Career ==
When Governor Dom Manuel Pereira Forjaz died suddenly in his bed on April 11, 1611, the bishop of Luanda and the leading men called upon Captain-Major Bento Banha Cardoso to take charge as interim governor. Cardoso was a man of enterprise and successful in his undertakings, but cruel. He took office on April 15, 1611.

In 1611, he defeated the ngola of Ndongo. That year, the king of Ndongo, Ambandi Angola, began attacking the market fairs in the interior and the Portuguese merchants that took part in them. Governor Bento Banha Cardoso prepared a new campaign against Ndongo and signed a pact of alliance with several Imbangala warlords, who would henceforth serve the Portuguese as mercenaries. Cardoso managed to temporarily pacify the region, build a fort at Ambaca and bring the number of Ambundu sobas under Portuguese suzerainty to a total of 78.

The sobas Kilonga and Mbamba Tungu fell into his hand and were beheaded, along with several of their makotas or advisors. To avenge them, fourteen sobas of Ndongo and Matamba sieged the Portuguese inland stronghold of Cambambe the following year, but the place was valiantly defended until relieved. However, it took another year before order was fully restored to the region. To keep the tribal lords in check, Cardoso had another fort built at Ambaca by the Lucala river in 1614, eight leagues from Massangano. That same year, Quissama was raided.

After the arrival of Manuel Cerveira Pereira, Cardoso resumed his role as captain-major of the Portuguese field army in Angola. Pereira was in turn succeeded by Fernão de Sousa, during whose term relations with Queen Nzinga were tense. As negotiations stalled, Sousa prepared for war but dismissed the idea of annexing Ndongo and instead turned to Hari a Kiluanje, lord of Pungo Andongo, whose claim to the throne of Ndongo he would support against Nzinga. The governor met with Hari a Kiluanje at Ambaca, and afterwards Queen Nzinga sieged Pungo Andongo, in early 1626.

Pungo Andongo was relieved by an army commanded by Bento Banha Cardoso, who forced Nzinga's forces to withdraw. Cardoso then marched on all of Ndongo, gathering the formal submission of the lords of the region and delivering the kingdom to Hari a Kiluanje. The Quindonga Islands were sieged in April but an epidemic broke out and after two months Queen Nzinga managed to slip through the lines with her supporters. Hari a Kiluanje fell victim to the plague but on October 12, 1626, governor Fernão de Sousa personally crowned at Pungo Andongo as king of Ndongo a brother of Hari a Kiluanje, who took the name of Dom Filipe de Sousa. Queen Nzinga lived on the run with her supporters between 1626 and 1629, frequently relocating to avoid capture by Portuguese forces. Captain-major Bento Banha Cardoso died in August 1628, and he was replaced by Paio de Araújo de Azevedo, who abandoned pursuit on May 29, 1629.

== See also ==
- Angolan Wars
- List of colonial governors of Angola
- History of Angola
- Colonial History of Angola
