= Baltasar Barreira =

Portuguese Jesuit missionary to Africa

Baltasar Barreira (Balthasar; 26 February 1531, in Lisbon – 4 June 1612) was a Portuguese Jesuit missionary to Africa.

== Missions ==
He was in Portuguese Angola, for 13 years, founding a school in Luanda in 1587. Later in life he went to West Africa, reaching the Portuguese Cape Verde Islands in 1604. He then travelled to Bissau the next year, and Sierra Leone; he visited Benin in 1607, Cacheu in 1608. He died on June 4, 1612.

== Works ==
His literary works consist chiefly of Relations written to the supervisors of the Society of Jesus. He is an eyewitness for matters of religion and slavery.

Accounts of the conversion of pagan tribes and the baptisms of native kings as well as treatises on the manners and customs of the people are the principal subjects of his writings. He recounted in detail the victory of the Portuguese, led by Paulo Dias de Novais, in a battle of 1583.
