= Hari a Kiluanje =

Hari a Kiluanje was an Ambundu tribal lord of Ndongo and claimant to its throne. The lord of the Black Stones of Pungo Andongo, Hari a Kiluanje was among the various Ndongo lords who opposed the brutal rule of King Ngola Mbandi of Ndongo and supported the Portuguese invasion of the kingdom in 1617.

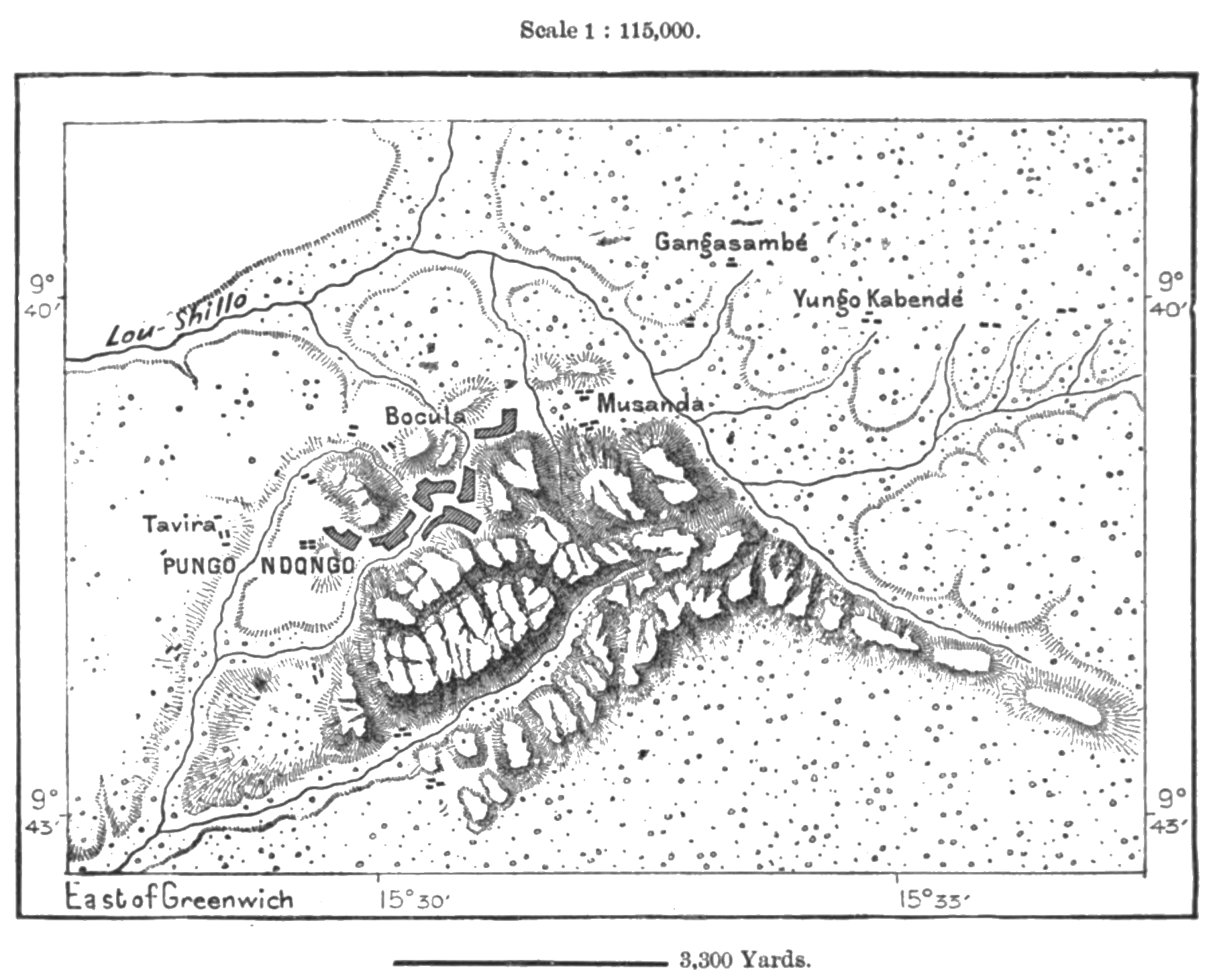
19th century map of the Black Stones of Pungo Andongo.

== Life ==
Queen Nzinga seized the throne of Ndongo and quarreled with the Portuguese at Luanda, yet her rule was not entirely accepted. Governor Fernão de Sousa dismissed the idea of conquering Ndongo and turned to Hari a Kiluanje, whose claim to the throne he would support. The governor met with Hari a Kiluanje at Ambaca and afterwards Queen Nzinga sieged Pungo Andongo, in early 1626.

Pungo Andongo was relieved by an army commanded by former governor Bento Banha Cardoso, who forced Nzinga's forces to withdraw. Cardoso then marched on all of Ndongo gathering the formal submission of the lords of the region and delivered the kingdom to Hari a Kiluanje. The Quindonga Islands were besieged in April but an epidemic broke out and after two months Queen Nzinga managed to slip through the lines with her supporters. Hari a Kiluanje fell victim to the plague.

On October 12, 1626, Governor Fernão de Sousa personally crowned at Pungo Andongo as king of Ndongo a brother of Hari a Kiluanje, Ngola Hari, who took the name of Dom Filipe de Sousa.

== See also ==
- Angolan Wars
- List of Ngolas of Ndongo
- Battle of Pungo Andongo
