= Bengo River =

River in Angola

- Location in Angola

Location
- Country: Angola

Physical characteristics
- Mouth
  - coordinates: 8°45′08″S 13°23′37″E

The Bengo (or Zenza) is a river in northern Angola with a source in the Crystal Mountains. Its mouth is at the Atlantic Ocean 20 kilometres (12 mi) north of Luanda in Bengo Province. The river is 300 kilometres (190 mi) long with a drainage area of 7,370 square kilometres (2,850 sq mi). There is a large reservoir called Kiminha on the Bengo. There are several small lakes on the lower 90 kilometres (56 mi) of the river floodplain including Lakes Panguila, Quilunda and Lalama. The Bengo River floodplain is the main source of the agricultural produce for Luanda. Drinking water from the Bengo River was transported to Luanda in barrels by boat before an aqueduct was built in 1889. Trucks deliver much of the city's modern water supply, loaded by pumps in the river.

Mangroves grow in the estuary, near their southern limit. Crocodiles, manatees, ducks and fish were among the wildlife in the river. The only aquaculture industry in Angola is a tilapia farm on the Bengo River at Kifangondo in Luanda Province.

The river has been the site of several battles. In 1641 the Portuguese retreated there when the Dutch captured Luanda. In 1873 the Dembos living between the Bengo and Dande rivers led an uprising against the Portuguese. The Battle of Quifangondo in 1975 was an important point in the Angolan Civil War.

== See also ==
- List of rivers of Angola
