= List of Ngolas of Ndongo =

The following is an incomplete list of Ngolas (rulers) of the Kingdom of Ndongo, a pre-colonial West−Central African state in what is now Angola.

The full title of those who ruled over the Northern Mbundu Kingdom of Ndongo was Ngola a Kilanje. The kingdom was south of Kingdom of Kongo. The last ruling dynasty moved east to the nearby Kingdom of Matamba, and continued to rule independently until 1741.

== Rulers of Ndongo as a BaKongo tributary ==
- King Ngola Kiluanji Kia Samba (c. 1515–1556)

== Rulers of Ndongo as an independent state ==
- King Ndambi a Ngola (1556–1561)
- King Ngola Kiluanji kia Ndambi (1561–1575)
- King Ngola Kilombo kia Kasenda (1575–1592)
- King Mbandi a Ngola (1592–1617)
- King Ngola Mbandi (1617–1624)
- Queen Ana de Sousa Nzingha Mbande (ruled 1624–1626)

== Rulers of Ndongo under Portuguese vassalage ==
- King Hari a Kiluanje (ruled 1626)
- King Ngola Hari (ruled 1626–1657)

Both of these supposed Kings were usurpers imposed upon the people by the Portuguese as during that time period they were at war with Njinga that considered herself to be the rightful ruler to the Kingdom of Ndongo. The loyalty of the Mbundu vassals, or sobas, changed continuously between Portugal and Njinga. Her Sovereignty was never recognised by Portugal until 1657, but during repeated occasions did she gain the fidelity of most of the Mbundu sobas. In 1642, the conquest of Luanda by the Dutch also technically cancels the Portuguese vassalage of the region at the time.

== Rulers of Ndongo-Matamba ==
- King Nzinga of Ndongo and Matamba (ruled 1657–1663)

=== Rulers of the state of Pungo a Ndongo ===
- Ngola Mukambu Mbandi (ruled 1663–1671; after the death of her sister, Nzinga of Ndongo and Matamba)

== See also ==
- Matamban and Ndongo monarchs
- Former monarchies of Africa
- Portuguese Angola
