= Dande River =

River in Angola

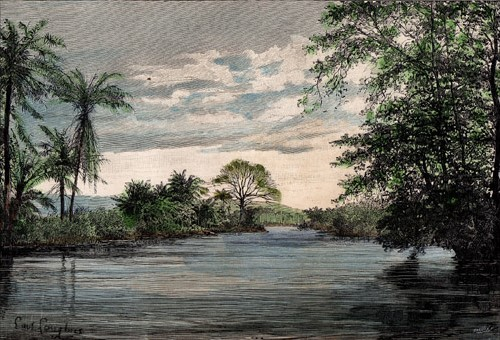
- View of the Rio Dande, 1888. Engraving of a photograph.

- Location in Angola

Location
- Country: Angola

Physical characteristics
- Mouth
  - coordinates: 8°28′18″S 13°22′22″E

The Dande is a river in northern Angola with a source in the Crystal Mountains. Its mouth is at the Atlantic Ocean at Barra do Dande in Bengo Province. It also flows through the city of Caxito, and Uige Province. The river is 285 kilometres (177 mi) long. The lower section of the river is a floodplain with several small lakes including Lakes Sungue, Ibendua and Morima.

The 18MW Mabubas Dam on the Dande is a significant power source in Northern Angola.

== See also ==
- List of rivers of Angola
- Energy in Angola
