= Ambaca =

- Municipality and town
- Location in Angola
- Coordinates: 8°11′S 15°22′E
- Country: Angola
- Province: Cuanza Norte

Population (2014 Census)
  - Total: 61,769
- Time zone: UTC+1 (WAT)

Ambaca is a town and municipality in Cuanza Norte Province in Angola. The municipality had a population of 61,769 in 2014.

In the 17th century, the Portuguese colonial authorities built a fort in the village of Camabatela, near the Lucala River margin.
