= Paulo Dias de Novais =

1st Captain-Governor of Portuguese Angola (1510–1589)

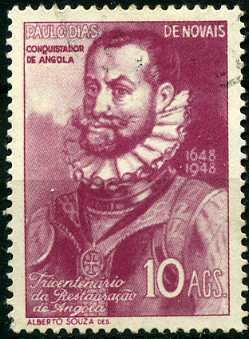

1st Donatário of Portuguese Angola
- In office 1575–1589
- Monarchs: Sebastian of Portugal; Henry of Portugal; Philip I of Portugal
- Preceded by: Office created
- Succeeded by: Luís Serrão

Personal details
- Born: c. 1510 Kingdom of Portugal
- Died: 9 May 1589 Massangano, Portuguese Angola

Military service
- Allegiance: Portuguese Empire

Paulo Dias de Novais (c. 1510 – 9 May 1589), a fidalgo of the Royal Household, was a Portuguese colonist in Africa in the 16th century and the first Captain-Governor of Portuguese Angola. He was the grandson of the explorer Bartolomeu Dias.

In the 1550, the ruling ngola ("king") of Ndongo absconded his allegiance to the Kingdom of Kongo and sought recognition from Portugal instead. The prospect of finding a source of silver, slaves, making converts and establishing a colony led Lisbon to dispatch an expedition in 1560 led by Paulo Dias de Novais and Jesuit missionary Father Gouveia. Both were captured however, and held for several years at Ndongo until the ruling ngola had died and his successor was unfriendly. Yet their letters to Lisbon attracted royal attention to Ndongo by stressing the supposed mineral wealth of the interior and the advantages of an overland route to Mozambique, passing through the gold mines in the heart of Africa. Young king Sebastian was eager to promote expansion overseas and in 1575 he granted a royal charter to Paulo Dias de Novais, appointing him donatário or donee.

Dias arrived in what is now Angola on 11 February 1575. Attracted by the prospect of the famous silver mines of Cambambe, he founded the settlement of São Paulo de Luanda, near the island of Luanda.

As governor of the new land, Dias sought to extract the land of its natural resources. This included copper, ivory, cattle hides, salt, sugar, and most importantly slaves. He had orders from King Sebastian to follow a policy of peaceful bilateral relations. He therefore signed an alliance with the ngola ("king") of Ndongo, Nzinga Ngola Kilombo Kia Kasenda. In exchange for military aid, the king would sell rebels, prisoners of war and his subjects sentenced to death for theft or adultery as slaves to the Portuguese, thus earning him great profits.

Novais died on May 9, 1589, and was buried in a simple tomb in front of the church of Massangano. He had funded the Angola venture out of his own pocket and died bankrupt.

== See also ==
- Angolan Wars
