= Forte de São Tiago das Cinco Pontas =

Brazilian fort

- Recife, Pernambuco in Brazil
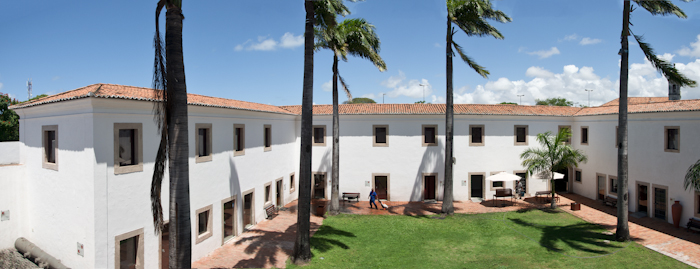
- View inside the fort

Site information
- Type: Fort

Location
- Location of Forte de São Tiago in Brazil
- Coordinates: 8.071417°S 34.865306°W

Forte de São Tiago das Cinco Pontas is a fort located in Recife, Pernambuco in Brazil.

It is on the location of the former Fort Frederik Hendrik, a pentagonal fortress built by the Dutch in 1630 near Mauritsstad, the capital of Dutch Brazil, and named after Frederick Henry, Prince of Orange. Portuguese forces retook Recife in 1654 and demolished the fortress in 1677.

== See also ==
- Dutch invasions of Brazil
- Military history of Brazil
- Siege of Recife (1630)
