= Siege of Recife =

Siege of Recife may refer to:

- Siege of Recife (1630)
- Recapture of Recife (1652–1654)
