= Treaty of The Hague (1661) =

Treaty between the Netherlands and Portugal

The Treaty of The Hague (also known as the Treaty of Den Haag) was signed on 6 August 1661 between representatives of the Dutch Republic and Portugal. Based on the terms of the treaty, the Dutch Republic recognized Portuguese sovereignty over New Holland (Dutch Brazil) in exchange for an indemnity of 4 million reis, conversion from 2 million caroli guilders, over the span of 16 years.

== History ==
In 1648–49 the Portuguese defeated the Dutch in the first and second battles of Guararapes, and gradually eliminated the Dutch presence in their colonies of Brazil and Angola. In January 1654 the Dutch in Brazil surrendered and signed the Treaty of Taborda, but only as a provisory pact (truce).

The Dutch, determined to recover Brazil, postponed the end of the conflict. Due to the First Anglo-Dutch War, the Dutch Republic had been unable to properly support the GWC in Brazil. With the end of the conflict with the English, the Dutch demanded the return of the colony in May 1654. The Province of Zeeland had the most to gain from the return of the colony, but Johan de Witt, the Grand Pensionary of Holland, preferred a monetary compensation. He did not want to reoccupy the colony and prioritized stronger trading ties with the Portuguese. To compensate Zeeland and save face he demanded eight million guilders from Portugal. The Portuguese, however, refused to return the colony or to pay the indemnity.

In the aftermath of the war against the English the Dutch fleet was worn and weary, and not able yet to undertake major operations so the Dutch instead authorized privateering assaults upon the Portuguese. In 1657, the Dutch fleet was again fit for large operations and the war resumed. Between 1657 and 1661, Dutch fleets, besides operating in the Second Northern War, regularly cruised before the Portuguese coast. Portuguese privateers also did considerable harm to Dutch West African and American shipping, but the blockades of the Portuguese coast crippled Portuguese maritime trade, while the VOC finished its conquest of Ceylon and the Malabar Coast in India at the same time.

In 1661, Portugal agreed to compensate the Dutch with eight million guilders and ceded the colonies of Ceylon (now Sri Lanka) and the Maluku Islands (part of present-day Indonesia). On August 6, 1661, the Dutch Republic formally ceded Brazil to the Portuguese Empire through the Treaty of The Hague. Despite the peace treaty the Dutch East India Company under Rijckloff van Goens would capture a few more Portuguese settlements in Asia before hostilities finally came to an end in 1663.

== Sources ==
- Blok, P.J. (1928). Michiel de Ruyter (PDF) (in Dutch). Martinus Nijhof.
- Bruijn, J. R. (2011). The Dutch Navy of the Seventeenth and Eighteenth Centuries. Oxford: Oxford University Press. ISBN 9780986497353.
- Israel, J. I. (1995). The Dutch Republic: its rise, greatness, and fall, 1477–1806. Oxford University Press. ISBN 9780198730729.
- Rowen, H. H. (1985). John de Witt: statesman of the "True Freedom". Cambridge University Press. ISBN 9780521303910.
- Cabral de Mello, Evaldo, O Negócio do Brasil – Portugal, os Países Baixos e o Nordeste 1641–1669. Rio de Janeiro: Topbooks, 1998. ISBN 85-86020-76-1

== See also ==
- List of treaties
