= Mauritsstad =

Capital of Dutch Brazil and the former name of Recife

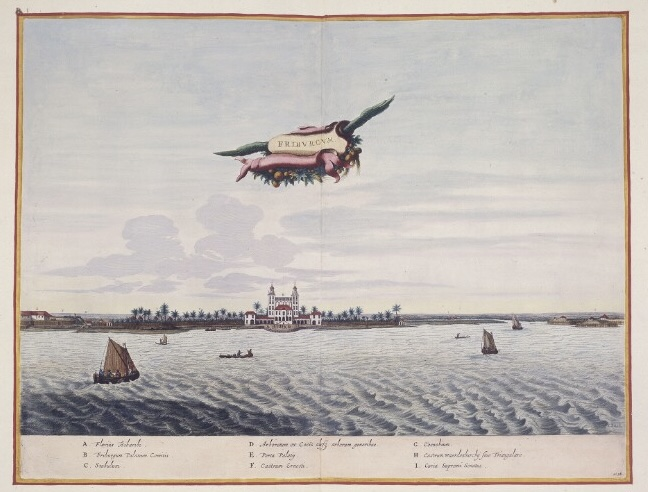
Mauritsstad in 1645, colored copperplate engraving, heightened with gold by Johan van Brosterhuysen, after a design by Frans Post.

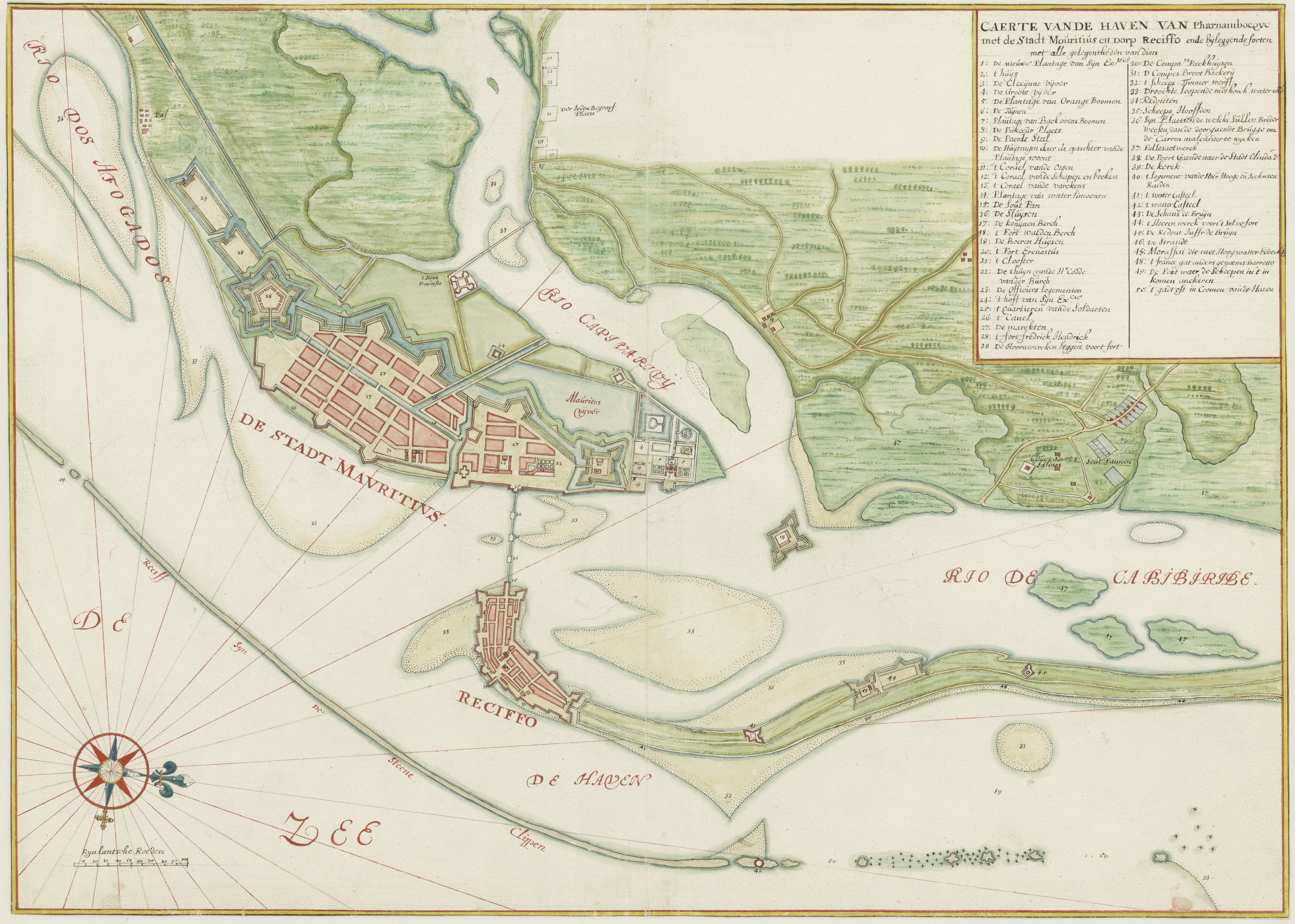
Watercolour chart of the cities of Mauritsstad and Recife in the 17th century.

Mauritsstad (or Mauritius) was the capital of Dutch Brazil, and is now a part of the Brazilian city of Recife.

== History ==
A Dutch fleet of 65 ships led by Hendrick Corneliszoon Loncq led a siege against Portuguese Brazil in 1630. The Dutch West India Company gained control of Olinda by 16 February 1630, and both Recife and the island of António Vaz (opposite Recife) by 3 March 1630.

The city of Mauritsstad was built on António Vaz and was designed by architect Pieter Post. It was named after Governor Johan Maurits van Nassau-Siegen, who had founded the city and the adjoining palace Vrijburgh. Mauritsstad was the cultural center of the New World, with the first botanical garden and the first zoo in the Americas, and a museum with three hundred stuffed monkeys. The city's Jewish population constructed the first synagogue in the Americas. The city was eventually recaptured by the Portuguese in 1654.

== Fort Frederik Hendrik ==
Fort Frederik Hendrik (Forte de São Tiago das Cinco Pontas) was a pentagonal fortress built near Mauritsstad in 1630 that was demolished by the Portuguese in 1677.
