= Dutch Brazil =

Dutch possession in South America between 1630–1654

Dutch Brazil Nederlands-Brazilië
- 1630–1654
- Flag Coat of arms
- Anthem: "Wilhelmus van Nassouwe" (Dutch) "'William of Nassau"
- Map of Dutch Brazil from 1630–1654, overlaid on a modern-day map of Brazil.
- Status: Dutch colony
- Capital: Mauritsstad
- Common languages: Dutch; Indigenous languages Portuguese
- Religion: Dutch Reformed (official), Catholicism, Judaism, Indigenous American religions, Traditional African religions
- Governor
  - 1637–1643: John Maurice, Prince of Nassau-Siegen
  - 1643–1654: Dutch West India Company
- History
  - Established: 16 February 1630
  - Arrival of Maurice of Nassau: 23 January 1637
  - First Battle of Guararapes: 19 April 1648
  - Second Battle of Guararapes: 19 February 1649
  - Defeat by the Portuguese: 28 January 1654
- Currency: Gulden
Preceded by	Succeeded by
Colonial Brazil	Colonial Brazil
- Today part of: Brazil

Dutch Brazil (Dutch: Nederlands-Brazilië; Portuguese: Brasil Holandês), also known as New Holland (Dutch: Nieuw-Holland), was a colony of the Dutch Republic in the northeastern portion of modern-day Brazil, controlled from 1630 to 1654 during Dutch colonization of the Americas. The main cities of the colony were the capital Mauritsstad (today part of Recife), Frederikstadt (João Pessoa), Nieuw Amsterdam (Natal), Saint Louis (São Luís), São Cristóvão, Fort Schoonenborch (Fortaleza), Sirinhaém, and Olinda.

From 1630 onward, the Dutch Republic conquered almost half of Brazil's settled European area at the time, with the capital and the Dutch West India Company (GWC) headquarters in Recife. The governor, John Maurice of Nassau, invited artists and scientists to the colony to help promote Brazil and increase immigration. However, the tide turned against the Dutch when the Portuguese won a significant victory at the Second Battle of Guararapes in 1649. On 26 January 1654, the Dutch surrendered and signed the capitulation, but only as a provisional pact. By May 1654, the Dutch Republic demanded that New Holland be given back. On 6 August 1661, New Holland was formally ceded to Portugal through the Treaty of The Hague.

While of only transitional importance for the Dutch, this period was of considerable importance in the history of Brazil. This period also precipitated a decline in Brazil's sugar industry, since conflict between the Dutch and Portuguese disrupted Brazilian sugar production, amidst rising competition from British, French, and Dutch planters in the Caribbean.

== Early Iberian-Dutch relations ==
The Habsburg family had ruled the Low Countries from 1482; the area became part of the Spanish Empire under the Spanish Habsburgs in 1556; however, in 1568 the Eighty Years' War (1568–1648) broke out, and the Dutch established the Republic of the Seven United Netherlands in 1581. As part of the war, Dutch raiders attacked Spanish lands, colonies, and ships. In 1594 Philip II, who was both king of Spain and (from 1580) of Portugal, gave permission for Dutch ships bound for Brazil to sail together once a year in a fleet of twenty ships. In 1609 the Habsburgs and the Dutch Republic signed the Twelve Years' Truce, during which the Dutch Republic was allowed to trade with Portuguese settlements in Brazil (Portugal was in a dynastic union with Habsburg Spain from 1580 to 1640). Portugal's small geographic size and small population meant that it needed "foreign participation in the colonization and commerce of its empire", and the Dutch had played such a role, which was mutually beneficial. As part of the truce of 1609–1621 the Dutch also agreed to delay the establishment of a West India Company (GWC), a counterpart to the already existing Dutch East India Company.

By the end of the truce, the Dutch had vastly expanded their trade networks and gained over half of the carrying trade between Brazil and Europe. The northern Netherlands operated 29 sugar refineries by 1622, versus 3 in 1595. In 1621, the twelve-year peace treaty expired and the United Netherlands immediately chartered a Dutch West India Company. The Dutch–Portuguese War, which had started in 1602, resumed, and through the new company the Dutch now started to interfere with the Spanish and Portuguese colonies in the Americas.

=== Unsuccessful 1624 invasion ===
As part of the Groot Desseyn plan, admiral Jacob Willekens led a GWC force to Salvador in December 1623, which was then the capital of Brazil and the center of a captaincy famous for its sugarcane. The expedition consisted of 26 ships and 3,300 men. They arrived on 8 May 1624, whereupon the Portuguese governor Diogo Tristão de Mendonça Furtado surrendered.

However, on 30 April 1625, a combined Spanish and Portuguese force consisting of 52 ships and 12,500 men recaptured the city. The city would then play a critical role as a base of the Portuguese struggle against the Dutch for the control of Brazil.

In 1628, the seizure of a Spanish silver convoy by Piet Heyn in Matanzas Bay provided the GWC the funds for another attempt to conquer Brazil at Pernambuco.

== Northeastern Brazil in the Golden Age of Dutch rule ==
Dutch siege of Olinda and Recife

=== Establishment of Dutch Brazil ===
==== Successful 1630 invasion ====
In the summer of 1629, the Dutch coveted a newfound interest in obtaining the captaincy of Pernambuco, the largest and richest sugar-producing area in the world. The Dutch fleet of 65 ships was led by Hendrick Corneliszoon Loncq; the GWC gained control of Olinda by 16 February 1630, and Recife (the capital of Pernambuco) and António Vaz by March 3.

==== Consolidation of Dutch control ====
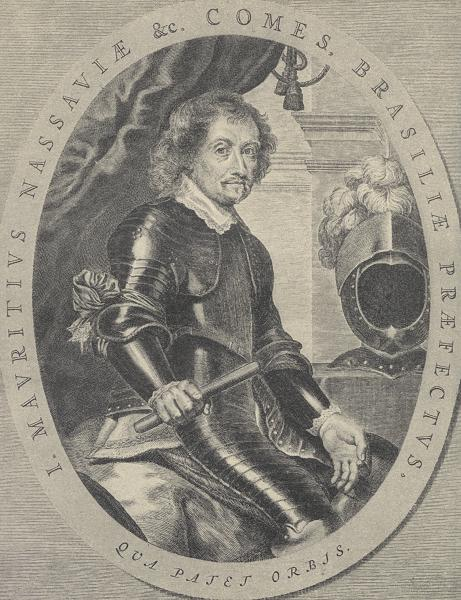
Maurice of Nassau became known as "The Brazilian" after returning to the Netherlands

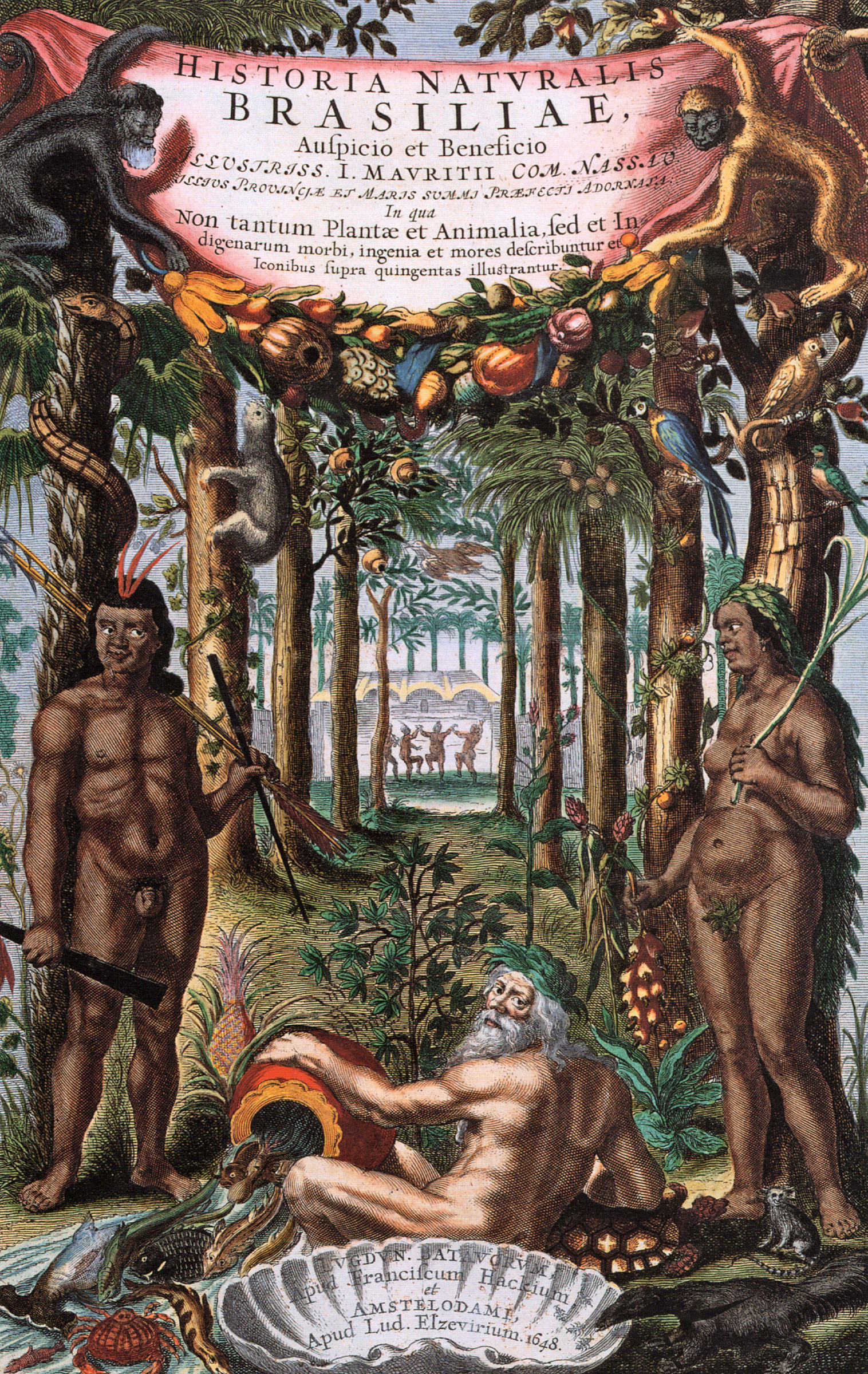
Title page of Historia Naturalis Brasiliae (1648)

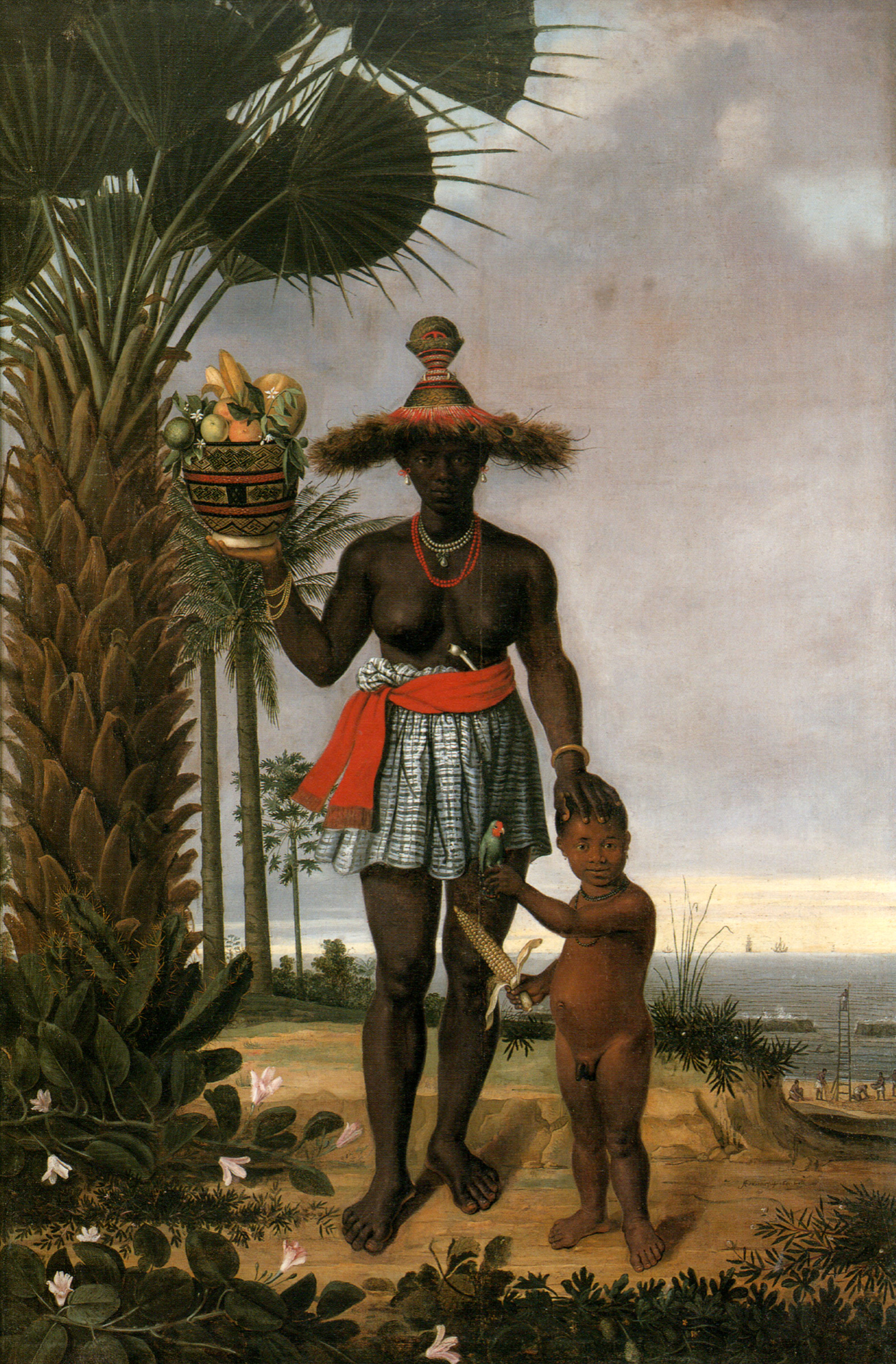
African woman in Brazil, by Albert Eckhout

Matias de Albuquerque, the Portuguese governor of Pernambuco, led a strong Portuguese resistance which hindered the Dutch from developing their forts on the lands which they had captured. By 1631, the Dutch left Olinda and tried to gain control of the Fort of Cabedello on Paraíba, the Rio Grande, Rio Formoso, and Cabo de Santo Agostinho. These attempts were also unsuccessful, however.

Still in control of António Vaz and Recife, the Dutch later gained a foothold at Cabo de Santo Agostinho. By 1634, the Dutch controlled the coastline from the Rio Grande do Norte to Pernambuco's Cabo de Santo Agostinho. They still maintained control of the seas as well. By 1635, many Portuguese settlers were choosing Dutch-occupied land over Portuguese-controlled land. The Dutch offered freedom of worship and security of property. In 1635, the Dutch conquered three strongholds of the Portuguese: the towns of Porto Calvo, Arraial do Bom Jesus, and Fort Nazaré on Cabo de Santo Agostinho. These strongholds gave the Dutch increased sugar lands which led to an increase in profit.

=== Dutch Brazil under Johan Maurits van Nassau-Siegen ===
In 1637, the GWC gave control of its Brazilian conquests, now called "Nieuw Holland," to John Maurice of Nassau, the great-nephew of William the Silent. Within the year, Maurice of Nassau captured the captaincy of Ceará and sent an expedition to capture the West African trading post of Elmina Castle, which became the capital of the Dutch Gold Coast. In 1641, the Dutch captured the captaincy of Maranhão, meaning that Dutch control now extended across the entire coastline between the Amazon and São Francisco Rivers.

==== Governance under Maurits ====
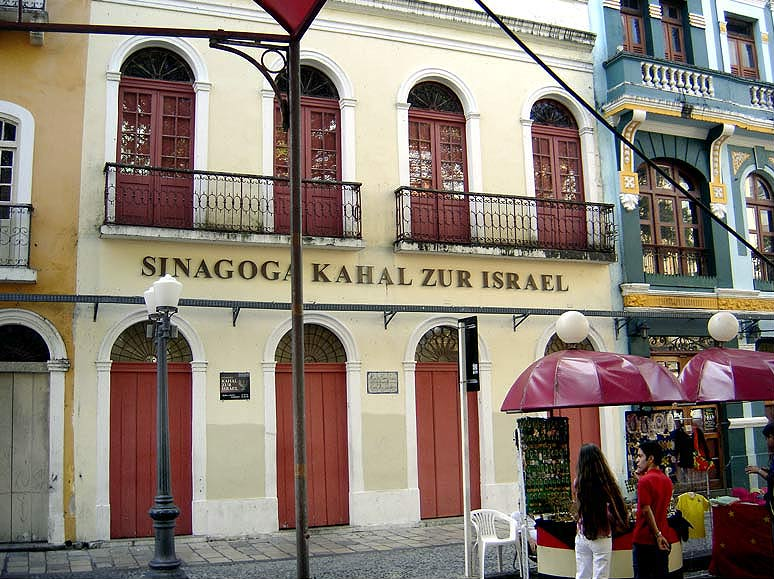
The Kahal Zur Israel Synagogue in Recife is the oldest synagogue in the Americas. An estimated number of 700 Jews lived in Dutch Brazil, about 4.7% of the total population

Maurice claimed to have always loved Brazil due to its beauty and its people, and under his rule, the colony thrived. His patronage of Dutch Golden Age painters to depict Brazil, such as Albert Eckhout and Frans Post, resulted in works showing different races, landscapes, and still lifes. He also invited naturalists Georg Marcgrave and Willem Piso to Brazil. They collected and published a vast amount of information on Brazil's natural history, resulting in the 1648 publication of Historia Naturalis Brasiliae, the first organized European compendium of knowledge on the Americas, which was hugely influential in learned European scientific circles for well over a century.

Maurits organized a form of representative local government by creating municipal councils and rural councils with both Dutch and Portuguese members to represent the population.

Maurits worked through the councils to begin modernizing the country with streets, bridges, and roads in Recife. On the island of António Vaz, he founded the town of Mauritsstad (also known as Mauricia), where he created an astronomic observatory and a meteorological station, which were the first created by Europeans in the Americas.

Under Maurits, protection for Portuguese Jews, who had been ostracized to that point, was increased. He allowed former Jews who had been forced to convert to Christianity to return to their former faith. Non-Catholic Christians, such as Calvinists, were also allowed to practice their faith as part of religious toleration. Furthermore, the Catholic majority in Dutch Brazil was allowed to practice their faith freely, at a time in history in which there was extreme religious conflicts such as the Thirty Years' War between Catholics and Protestants. This was formed into the new law of Dutch Brazil in the peace accord signed after the conquest of the captaincy of Paraiba. The monastic orders of the Franciscans, Carmelites, and Benedictines were quite prominent in the former Portuguese colony. They were also allowed to retain all of their friaries and monasteries and allowed to practice and preach Catholicism among the population.

==== Population of Dutch Brazil ====
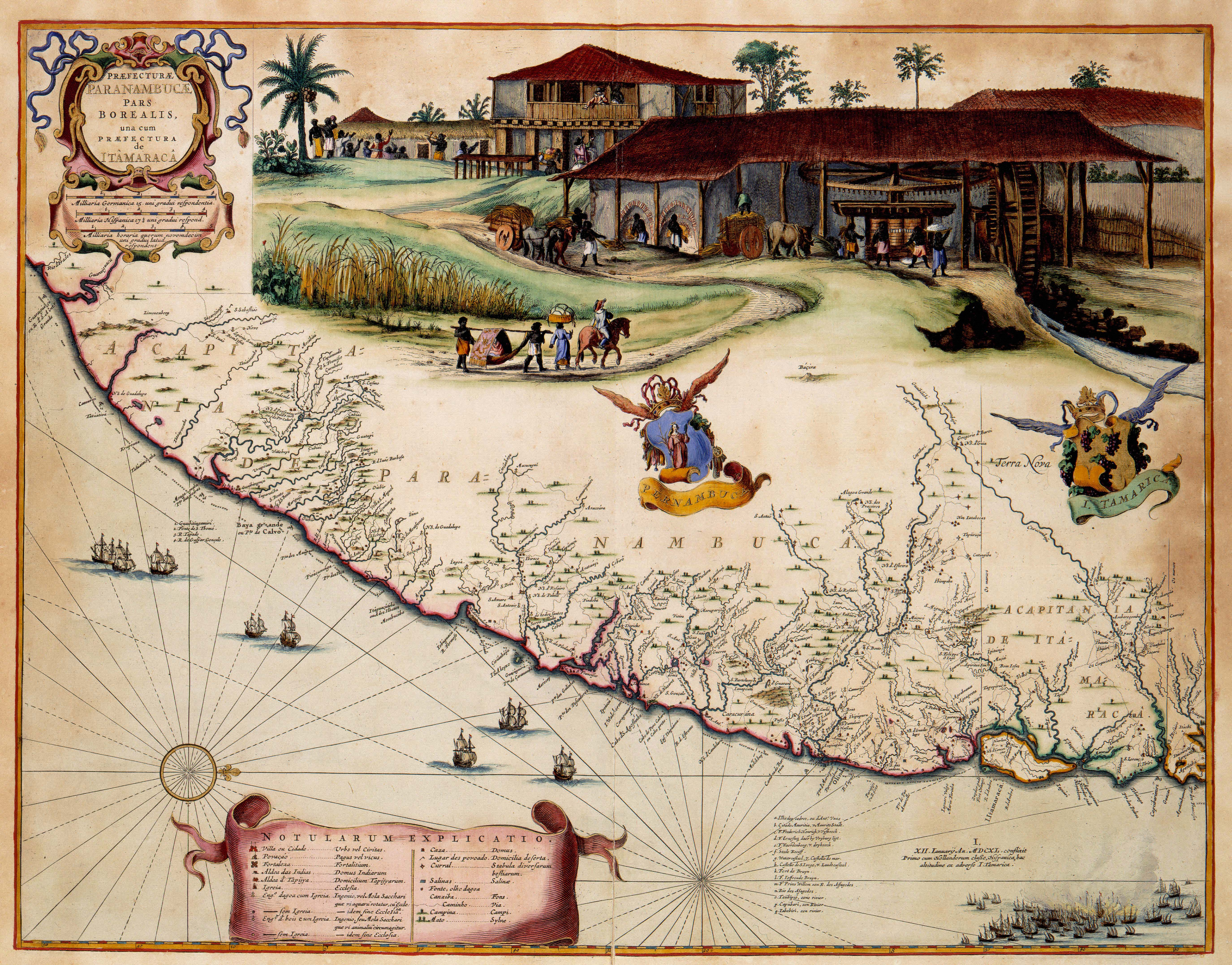
Map of Pernambuco and Itamaraca showing slaves working on a sugar plantation in the Dutch colony, 1643.

Although there were Dutch emigrants to Brazil, the majority of the population was Portuguese and Brazilian-born Portuguese, African slaves, and Amerindians, with Dutch rule an overlay on pre-existing social groups. Dutch Brazil had difficulty in attracting Dutch colonists, as the main attraction of the colony was the wealth one could gain from a sugar plantation, as Brazil was a major supplier of sugar to Europe. Since this would also entail buying African slaves, only a rich man could afford to start a plantation.

There was also very significant risk with border contention and skirmish with the Portuguese from the parts of Brazil still under their control and the nonexistent loyalty of the local Portuguese to the Dutch colony. Most of the Dutchmen employed by the Dutch West India Company went back to the Netherlands after they were relieved of duty and did not stay to settle the colony. The Dutch were a ruling minority over a predominantly Portuguese-speaking population. The Dutch colonists were divided into two separate groups, the first of which was known as dienaren (servants). The dienaren were soldiers, officials, and Calvinist ministers employed by the GWC.

Vrijburgheren ("free gentlemen") – or vrijluiden – were the second group of Dutch settlers who did not fit into the category of dienaren. The vrijburgheren were mostly soldiers formerly employed by the GWC, who later settled as farmers or engenho lords. Others who did not fit the vrijburgher or dienar categories included Dutch who left the Netherlands to find a new life in Nieuw Holland as traders. Most trade in Nieuw Holland was under the control of this group.

== The end of Dutch Brazil ==
=== Departure of Maurits ===
In 1640, John, 8th Duke of Braganza, declared Portuguese independence from Spain, ending the six decade-long Iberian Union. As a result, the threat of further Spanish intervention against Dutch Brazil declined, since Brazil was originally and had remained a Portuguese colony. In 1641–1642, the new Portuguese regime concluded a truce with the Dutch, temporarily ending hostilities, but the Dutch remained in Brazil. In 1643, Maurice of Nassau equipped the expedition of Hendrik Brouwer that unsuccessfully attempted to establish an outpost in southern Chile. In 1644, the GWC recalled Maurice to Europe in an attempt to cut military expenditures, following the cessation of hostilities.

=== Demise of Dutch West India Company in Brazil ===
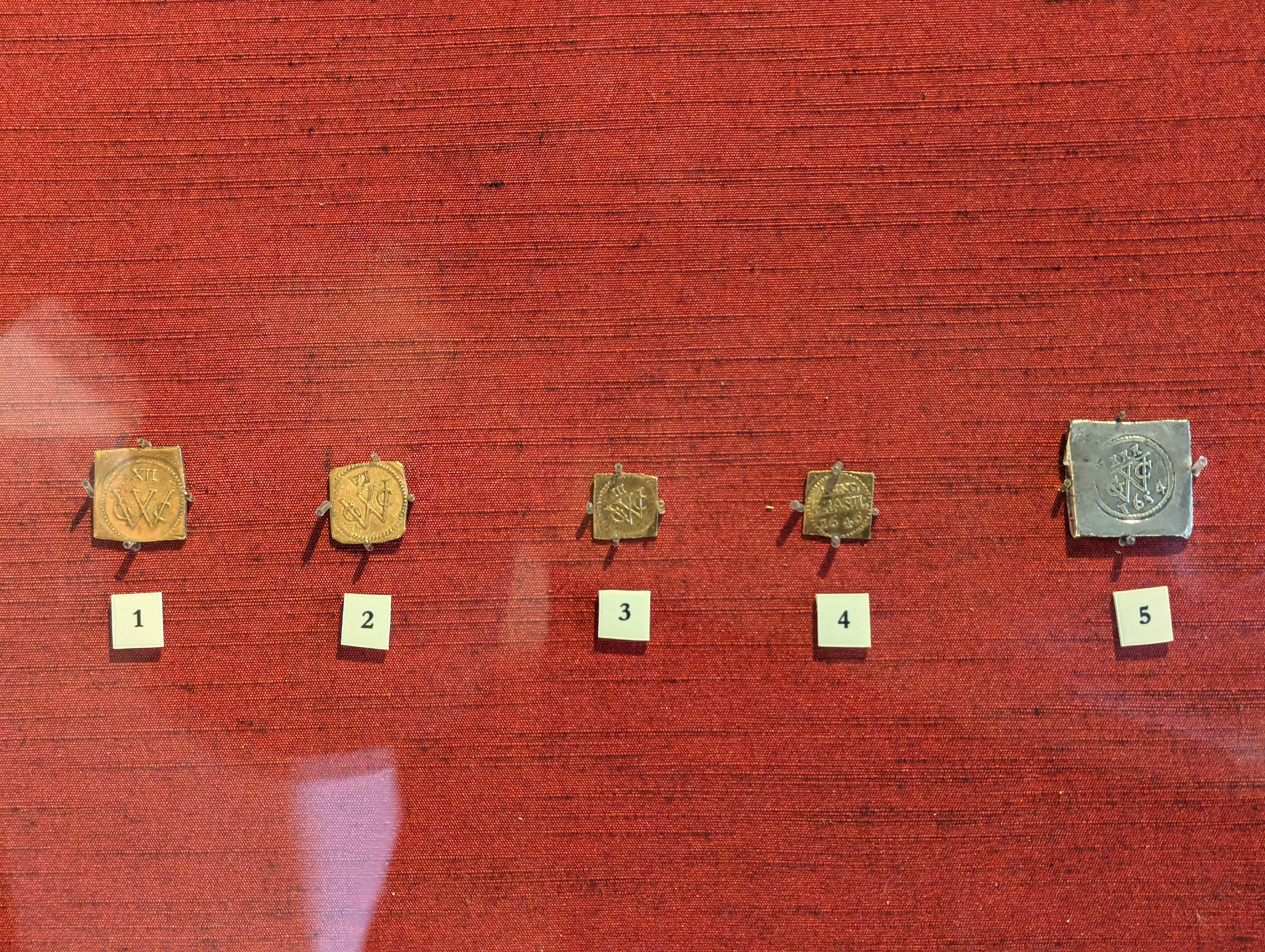
Facing an economic crisis in Brazil and with slow support from the European mainland, emergency coinage was struck for use as payment to troops in Brazil, first in 1645–1646 in gold, and then later in 1654 in silver. They were the first coins struck in Brazil and the first instance of the name "Brasil" in currency.

A year after Maurice was summoned back by the GWC board, the GWC faced a major uprising of Portuguese planters in June 1645. The Portuguese planters around Pernambuco had never fully accepted Dutch rule and had also resented the high interest rates charged by Dutch moneylenders for loans to rebuild their plantations following the initial Dutch conquest. In August, the planters revolted and prevailed over Dutch forces in a minor battle fought outside Recife, effectively ending Dutch control over the colony. That year, the Portuguese gained Várzea, Sirinhaém, Pontal de Nazaré, the Fort of Porto Calvo, and Fort Maurits. By 1646, the GWC only controlled four toeholds along the Brazilian coast, chief among them being Recife.

In the spring of 1646, the Dutch sent a relief expedition to Recife consisting of 20 ships with 2,000 men, temporarily forestalling the fall of the city. Back in Europe, the collapse of Dutch Brazil accelerated Dutch efforts to end its longstanding conflict with Spain, the Eighty Years' War. In August 1647, representatives from the Dutch province of Zeeland (the final holdout against peace with Spain) acquiesced to the Peace of Munster ending the war with Spain. In return, Zeeland obtained promises from the other Dutch provinces to support a second, larger relief expedition to reconquer Brazil. The expedition, consisting of 41 ships with 6,000 men, set sail on 26 December 1647.

In Brazil, the Dutch had already abandoned Itamaracá on 13 December 1647. The new expeditionary force arrived late at Recife, with many of its soldiers either dead or mutinous from lack of pay. In April 1648, the Portuguese routed the expeditionary force at the First Battle of Guararapes, fought outside Recife. The Portuguese had sent an armada of 84 ships, including 18 warships, to recapture Recife. The Dutch were dealt a further blow by the decisive Portuguese victory in the Recapture of Angola, which crippled the Dutch colony in Brazil as it could not survive without the slaves from Angola. In February 1649, the Portuguese again routed the Dutch at the Second Battle of Guararapes.

==== Recapture of Recife ====
After the Portuguese victories at Guararapes, the remaining Dutch retreated inside Recife. In 1654, after a two-year siege, Recife fell to the Portuguese, ending Dutch Brazil.

=== Role of the Amerindians and Africans ===
Although the historical focus is usually on the European rivals in the conflict, the local indigenous population was drawn into the conflict as allies on both sides. Most sided with the Dutch, but there were some notable exceptions. One was a Potiguara chieftain who came to be known as Dom Antônio Filipe Camarão, who was rewarded for his loyalty to the Portuguese by being made a knight of the Order of Christ. In the aftermath of the conflict when the Dutch were expelled, there were reprisals against their Amerindian allies.

Both the Dutch and the Portuguese used African slaves in the conflict, sometimes with the promise of freedom for fighting. On the Portuguese side, one name went down in history, Henrique Dias, who was awarded noble status by the monarch, but not the knighthood in the Order of Christ as promised.

=== Aftermath ===
In the aftermath of the Dutch occupation, Portuguese settled scores with Amerindians who had supported the Dutch. There were tensions between Portuguese who had fled the area under occupation and those who had lived under Dutch occupation. The returnees attempted to litigate so as to regain the properties they had abandoned, which in this sugar-producing area included sugar mills and other buildings, as well as cane fields. The litigation dragged on for years.

The conflict in Brazil's northeast had severe economic consequences. Both sides had practiced a scorched earth policy that disrupted sugar production, and the war had diverted Portuguese funds from being invested in the colonial economy. After the war, Portuguese authorities were forced to spend their tax revenues on rebuilding Recife. The sugar industry in Pernambuco never fully recovered from the Dutch occupation, being surpassed by sugar production in Bahia.

Meanwhile, the British, French, and Dutch Caribbean had become a major competitor to Brazilian sugar due to rising sugar prices in the 1630s and 1640s. After the GWC evacuated Pernambuco, the Dutch brought their expertise and capital to the Caribbean instead. In the 1630s, Brazil provided 80% of the sugar sold in London, while it only provided 10% by 1690. The Portuguese colony of Brazil did not recover economically until the discovery of gold in southern Brazil during the 18th century.

The Dutch period in Brazil was "a historical parenthesis with few lasting traces" in the social sphere. Dutch artistic production in Brazil, particularly by Albert Eckhout and Frans Post left an important visual record of the local people and places in the early 17th century.

=== Peace treaty ===
Seven years after the surrender of Recife, a peace treaty was organized between the Dutch Republic and Portugal. The Treaty of the Hague was signed on 6 August 1661, and it demanded that the Portuguese would pay 4 million réis over the span of 16 years in order to help the Dutch recover from the loss of Brazil.

== See also ==
- Colonial Brazil
- Dutch West India Company
- Camarão Indians' letters
- 17th century Dutch Brazil:
  - Georg Marcgrave
  - Willem Piso
  - Caspar Barlaeus
  - Frans Post
  - Albert Eckhout
  - Zacharias Wagenaer
  - Isaac Aboab da Fonseca
  - Historia Naturalis Brasiliae (1648)
- Recife and Pernambuco:
  - Ricardo Brennand Institute
