= Coat of arms of Brazil =

Versions
- Version used by the Federal Senate of Brazil
- Armiger: Federative Republic of Brazil
- Adopted: 11 May 1992
- Shield: Round sky-blue shield containing five argent stars arranged in the form of the Southern Cross, with the field's bordure outlined in gold and charged with argent stars in number equal to the existing in the National Flag.
- Supporters: A Mullet parted gyronny of ten Or and Vert, charged with a Sword in pale, pommelled Or, hilted Azure, and in the centre of the hilt, Gules charged with a mullet of five points Or, to the dexter, a sprig of coffee proper, and to the sinister, a sprig of tobacco, also proper, tied together by a ribbon Azure.
- Motto: República Federativa do Brasil - 15 de Novembro de 1889 (Portuguese: 'Federative Republic of Brazil - 15 November 1889')
- Other elements: The whole assembled on a splendor of gold, the contours of which form a star of 20 points.

The coat of arms of Brazil (Portuguese: Brasão de Armas do Brasil) was created on 19 November 1889, four days after Brazil became a republic. It consists of the central emblem surrounded by coffee (Coffea arabica, at the left) and tobacco (Nicotiana tabacum, at the right) branches, which were important crops in Brazil at that time. In the round shield in the center, the Southern Cross (Cruzeiro do Sul) can be seen. The ring of 27 stars around it represents Brazil's 26 states and the Federal District.

The blue ribbon contains the official name of Brazil, República Federativa do Brasil ("Federative Republic of Brazil") in its first line. Prior to 1964, this line contained the previous official name, Estados Unidos do Brasil (“United States of Brazil”). In the second line, the date of the proclamation of the Republic (15 November 1889) is written.

== National arms ==
The National Arms of the Republic were instituted by Decree No. 4, with alteration made by Law No. 5443 of 28 May 1968 (Annex No. 8) The making of the National Arms should conform to the proportions of 15 units of height by 14 of width and take into account the following provisions:

- I - The round shield will be composed of a sky-blue [azul-celeste] field containing five silver [prata] stars arranged in the form of the Southern Cross, with the bordure [bordura] of the field outlined in gold and charged with silver stars equal to the stars existing in the National Flag (Modification made by Law No. 8421 of 11 May 1972).
- II - The shield will be placed on a star parted gyronny of ten pieces, green [sinopla] and gold, bordered by two strips, the inner red [goles] and the outer gold.
- III - All placed on a sword in pale, pommelled gold, hilted blue [blau], except for the center part, which is red [goles] and contains a silver star, all upon a crown formed by a branch of coffee fruited on the dexter side and another of flowering tobacco on the sinister side, both in proper colors, tied blue [blau], the whole assembled on a splendor of gold, the contours of which form a star of 20 points.

== Arms of the Empire of Brazil ==
The Arms of the Empire of Brazil were used by both Emperors Pedro I and Pedro II until the downfall of the monarchy in 1889. These arms (with modifications) are used by the present imperial house.

On 18 September 1822, eleven days after proclaiming Brazil's independence Royal Prince Dom Pedro signed a decree instituting these arms stating "... henceforth the arms of this Empire of Brazil will be, on a green field, a gold armillary sphere superimposed on a Portuguese Templar cross, the sphere encircled by 19 silver stars on a blue circle; and an imperial crown with diamonds set atop the shield, the sides of which will be embraced by two plants of coffee and tobacco, as emblems of its [the Empire's] riches, in their proper colors and tied at the bottom with the national bow-knot."

On 12 October 1822 when the newly independent country was declared an Empire and Prince Pedro became the country's first emperor, the coat of arms became known as the Imperial Coat of Arms.

The number of stars in the coat of arms reflected the number of provinces in the Brazilian Empire.

The design of the Crown in the coat of arms changed twice. From 18 September to 12 October 1822, the day when Emperor Dom Pedro I was crowned, the design of the Royal Crown of Portugal was used; from that day until 18 July 1841, the design of the Imperial Crown made for the first Brazilian Emperor was used.

On the latter date, when Brazil's second emperor, Pedro II was crowned, using a new richer crown that was manufactured for him, the design of such Crown replaced the image of the older diadem in the coat of arms, and remained in use until the downfall of the Empire. That is the best-known version of the imperial coat of arms of Brazil.

== Arms of the Republic ==
Proposed republican coat of arms, adopted by early republicans after the 1870 Itu Convention, which switched the imperial crown for a Phrygian cap.

The Republican coat of arms was adopted on 1889 after the Proclamation of the Republic. It was designed by German-Brazilian engineer Artur Zauer and lithographer Luís Gruder, both working under the Laemert printing house, which presented the symbol to Marshal Deodoro da Fonseca — the first President of Brazil — who immediately approved it and made it official as the national coat of arms.

The coat of arms went through its first change on 1968, adopting a brighter color gradient. And then had two smaller changes on 1971 and 1992, both adding more stars to represent newly created Brazilian states.

== Gallery ==
Coat of arms of the Portuguese Brazil (1500–1815)

Coat of arms of the United Kingdom of Portugal, Brazil and Algarves (1816–1821)

Coat of arms of newly independent Brazil until the Coronation of the first Emperor, Pedro I (18 September 1822 – 1 December 1822)

Imperial Coat of arms, design of the first reign (note the crimson velvet within the Crown), kept in usage in the early second reign, until the Coronation of Emperor Pedro II (when the design of the Crown was modified, to reflect the shape of the new Crown, and its dark green velvet cap (1 December 1822 – 18 July 1840)

Imperial Coat of arms, complete version, design of the second reign (18 July 1840–1889). A simplified version was also used.

Coat of arms of the United States of Brazil (1889–1931)

Coat of arms of the United States of Brazil (1931–1968)

Coat of arms of the Federative Republic of Brazil (1968–1971)

Coat of arms of the Federative Republic of Brazil (1971–1992)

Coat of arms of the Federative Republic of Brazil (1992–present)

== See also ==
- Flag of Brazil
- Brazilian heraldry
- Armorial of Brazil
- Coat of arms of Dutch Brazil
