= Siege of Recife (1630) =

1630 siege

- Part of the Dutch invasions of Brazil
- Dutch siege of Olinda and Recife
Date	February 14 – March 3, 1630
Location	Pernambuco, Brazil
Result	Dutch victory
Territorial changes	Establishment of Dutch Brazil

Belligerents
Dutch Republic	Portugal

Commanders and leaders
(Dutch West India Company) Hendrick Lonck	(Portugal) Matias de Albuquerque

Strength
7,000 Troops; 67 Ships	Unknown

Casualties and losses
Unknown	Unknown

The siege of Recife was a battle between Dutch and Portuguese forces near modern-day Recife, Brazil, in 1630.

In the summer of 1629, the Dutch coveted a newfound interest in obtaining the captaincy of Pernambuco, the largest and richest sugar-producing area in the world. The Dutch fleet of 65 ships was led by Hendrick Corneliszoon Loncq. The Dutch West India Company gained control of Olinda by 16 February 1630, and Recife (the capital of Pernambuco) and the island of António Vaz (opposite to the town) by 3 March.

This began a war over Brazil, which would see the Dutch establish a colony called New Holland and end with the Portuguese regaining their captured possessions.

== See also ==
- Mauritsstad
- Recapture of Recife (1652–1654)
