= Coat of arms of Dutch Brazil =

Colonial coat of arms

Coat of arms of Dutch Brazil

Coat of arms of New Holland (Dutch Brazil), resulting of the union of the four coats of the main Dutch dominions in Northeastern Brazil: The first quarter represents Pernambuco; the second quarter, on the right, Itamaracá; below, on the left, Paraíba and finally Rio Grande do Norte.

== Gallery ==
Coat of arms of the Captaincy of Pernambuco

Coat of arms of the Captaincy of Itamaracá

Coat of arms of the Captaincy of Paraíba

Coat of arms of the Captaincy of Rio Grande

Coat of arms of the comarcas (counties) of Pernambuco:

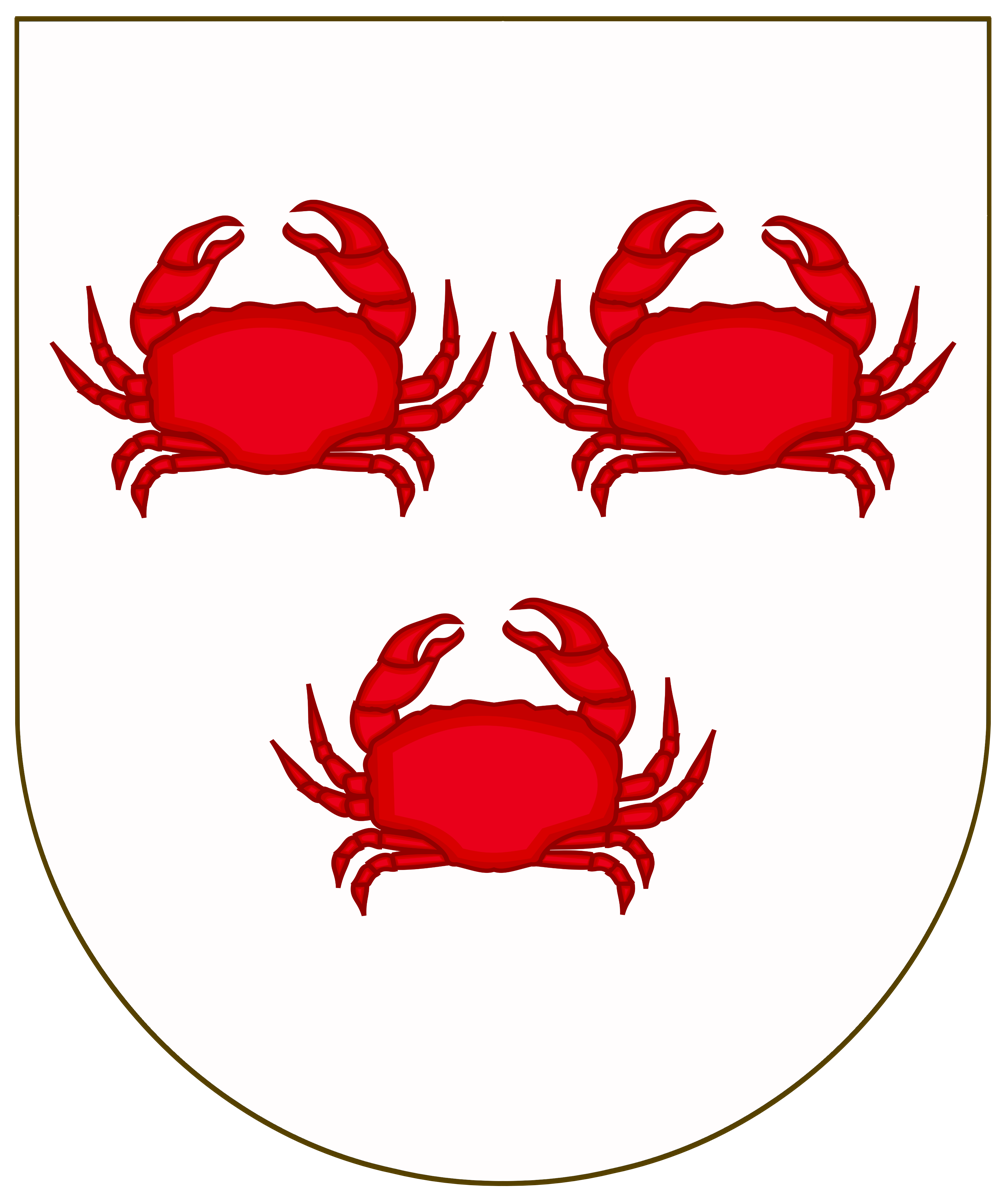
Coat of arms of the Comarca of Igarassu

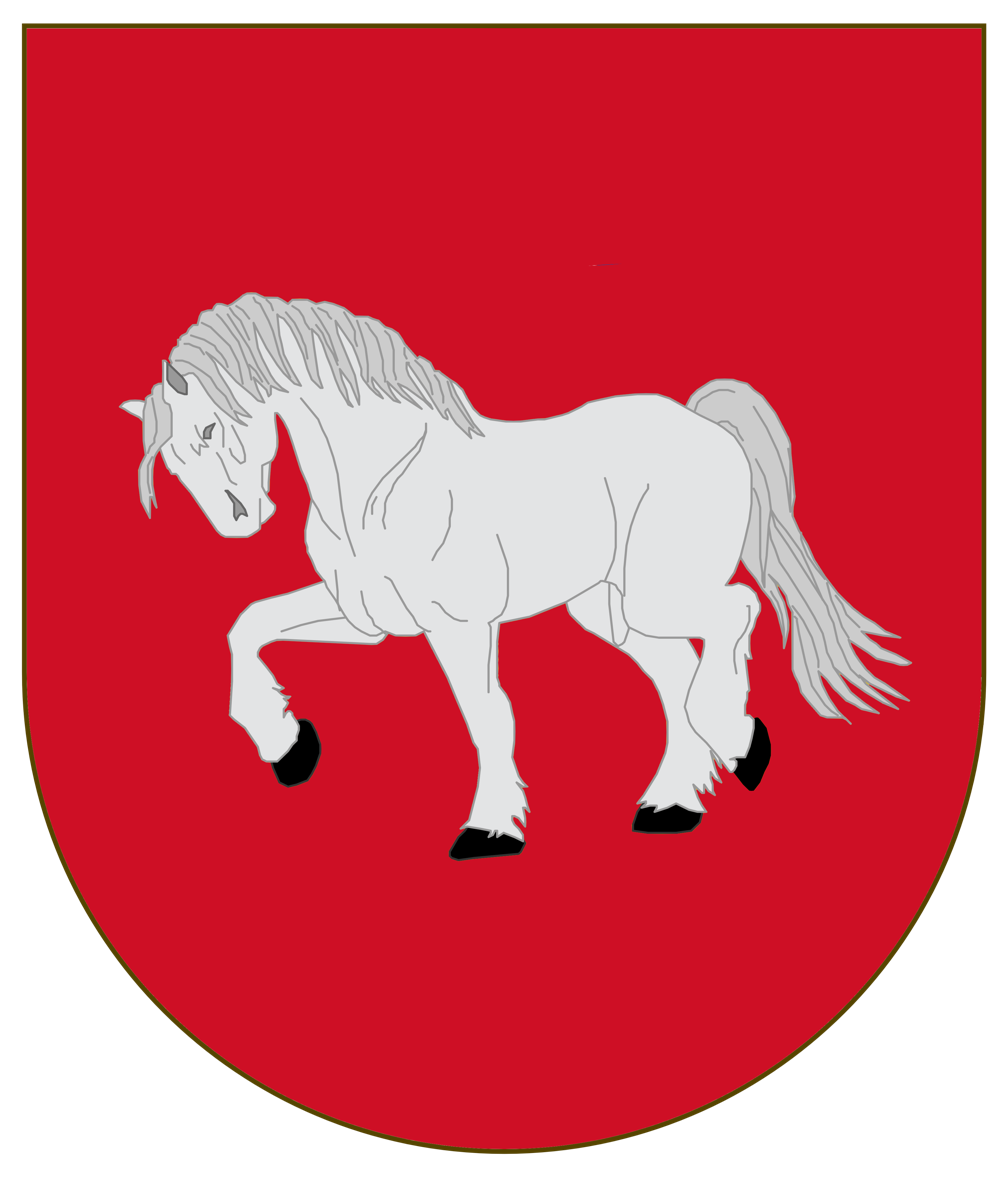
Coat of arms of the Comarca of Serinhaém

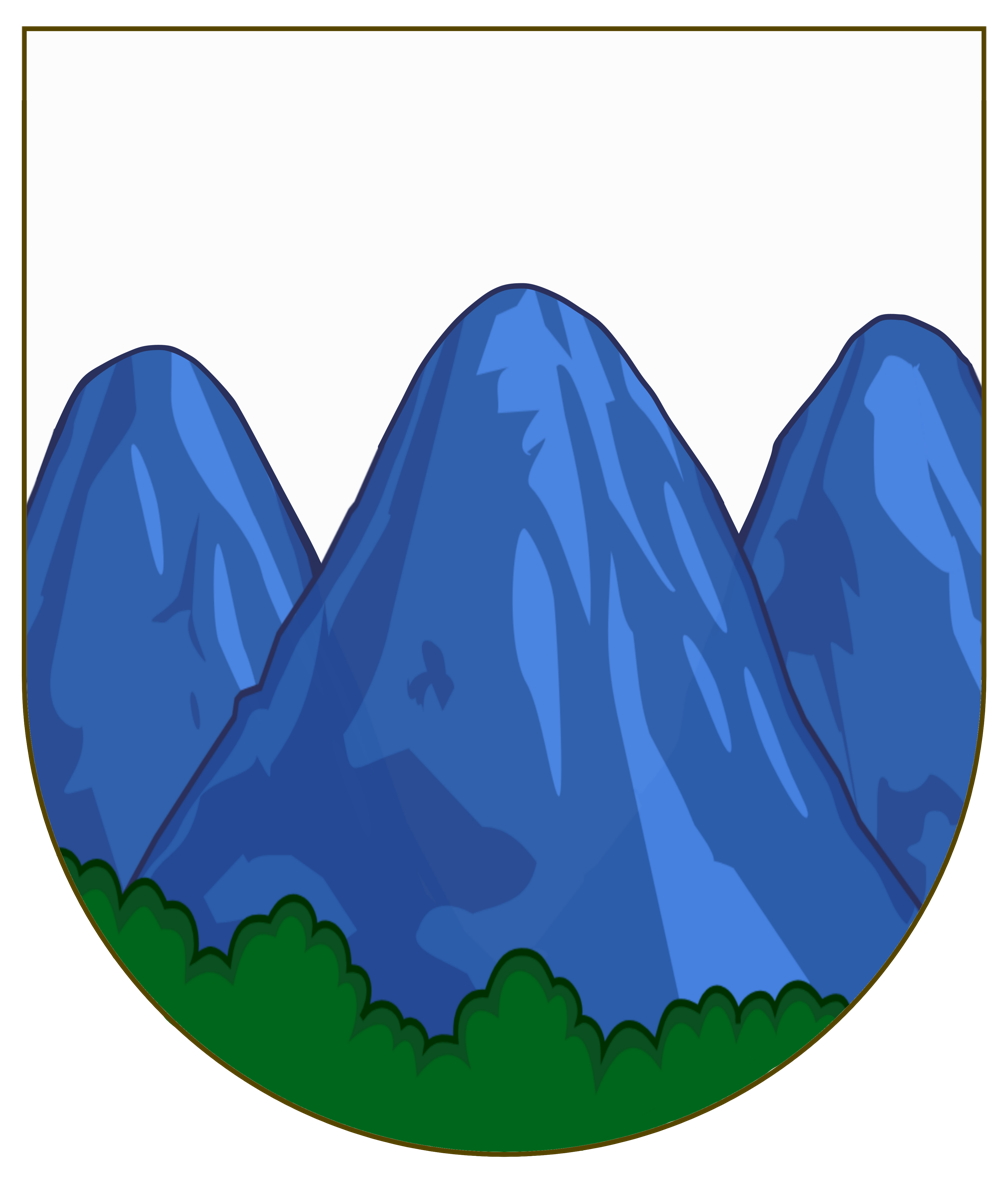
Coat of arms of the Comarca of Porto Calvo

Coat of arms of the Comarca of Alagoas

== See also ==
- Coat of arms of the Netherlands
- Coat of arms of Brazil
