= Palácio de Friburgo =

Former palace in Recife, Brazil

Palace of Friburgo
- Palácio de Friburgo
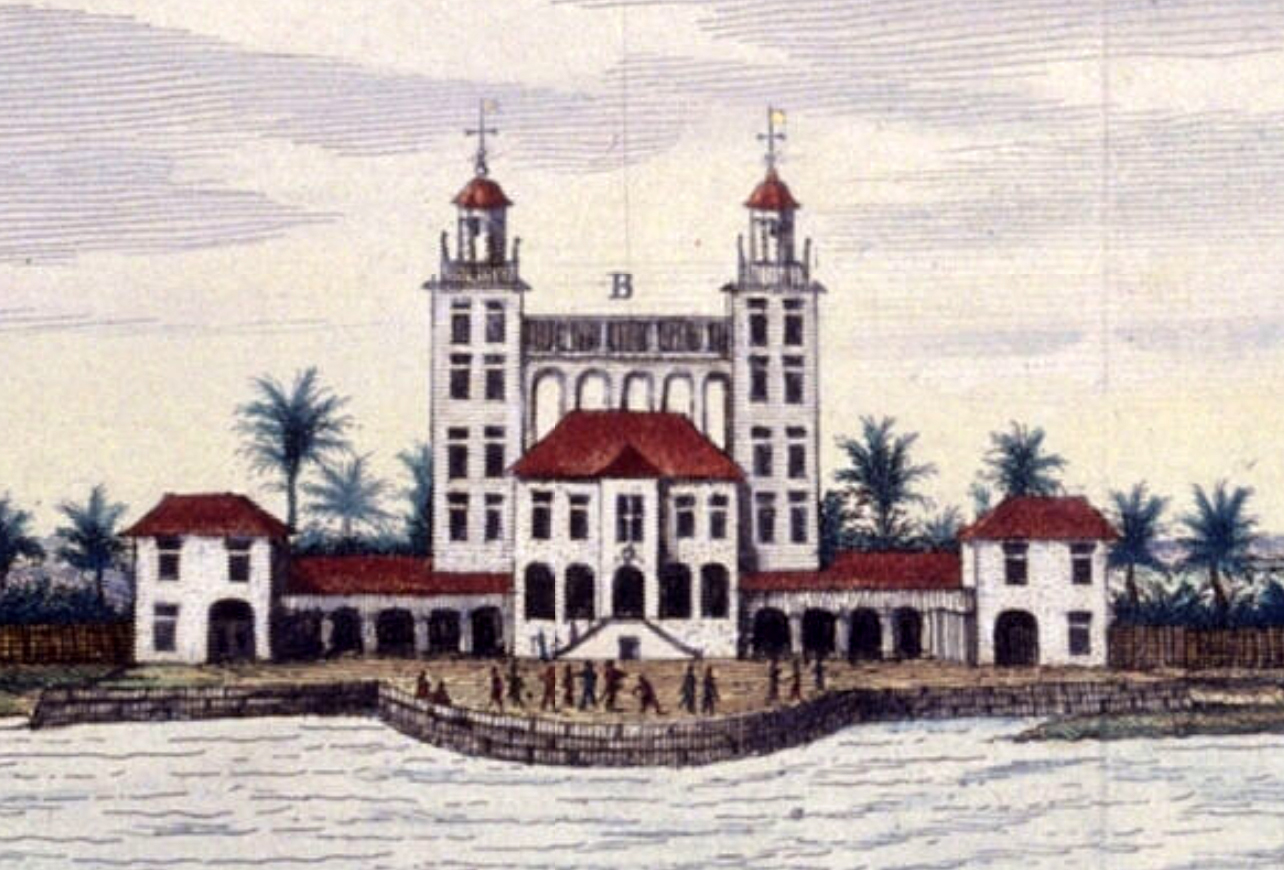
- Freiburg Palace in detail in an engraving by Frans Post (c. 1643).
- Interactive map of the Palace of Friburgo area
- Alternative names: Palácio das Torres (Palace of the Towers)

General information
- Type: Official residence
- Location: Recife; Dutch Brazil, Brazil
- Coordinates: 8°3′39.03″S 34°52′39.8″W
- Construction started: 1640
- Inaugurated: 1642
- Demolished: 1774-1787

Design and construction
- Architect: Pieter Post

The Palácio de Friburgo (English: Palace of Friburgo; Dutch: Vrijburg) also known as the Palácio das Torres (Palace of the Towers), was an official residence built by Count John Maurice of Nassau-Siegen between 1640 and 1642 in what was then Mauritsstad, the capital of the Dutch colony of Nova Holanda ("New Holland") - now the city of Recife, capital of the Brazilian state of Pernambuco. It existed until the second half of the 18th century, when it was demolished due to the damage caused during the Pernambuco Insurrection.

When it was built, the palace was the most monumental structure in Brazil, having the first observatory of the Southern Hemisphere. It also housed the first lighthouse and the first botanical garden in the Americas.

Between 2013 and 2015, a virtual model of the palace and its surroundings was developed at the request of Itaú Cultural.

== History ==
The Palace of Friburgo, the residence of John Maurice in Dutch Brazil, was built on the island of Antônio Vaz, now the Santo Antônio neighborhood of Recife, in the area that today corresponds to the República Square. The land was acquired by the count in 1639, and construction began the following year and was completed in early 1642. The palace, in front of which there was a staircase and a rectangular walled courtyard with a rounded front area, was built facing east, the sea and the old port area of Recife, while the back faced west, at the mouth of the Capibaribe River.

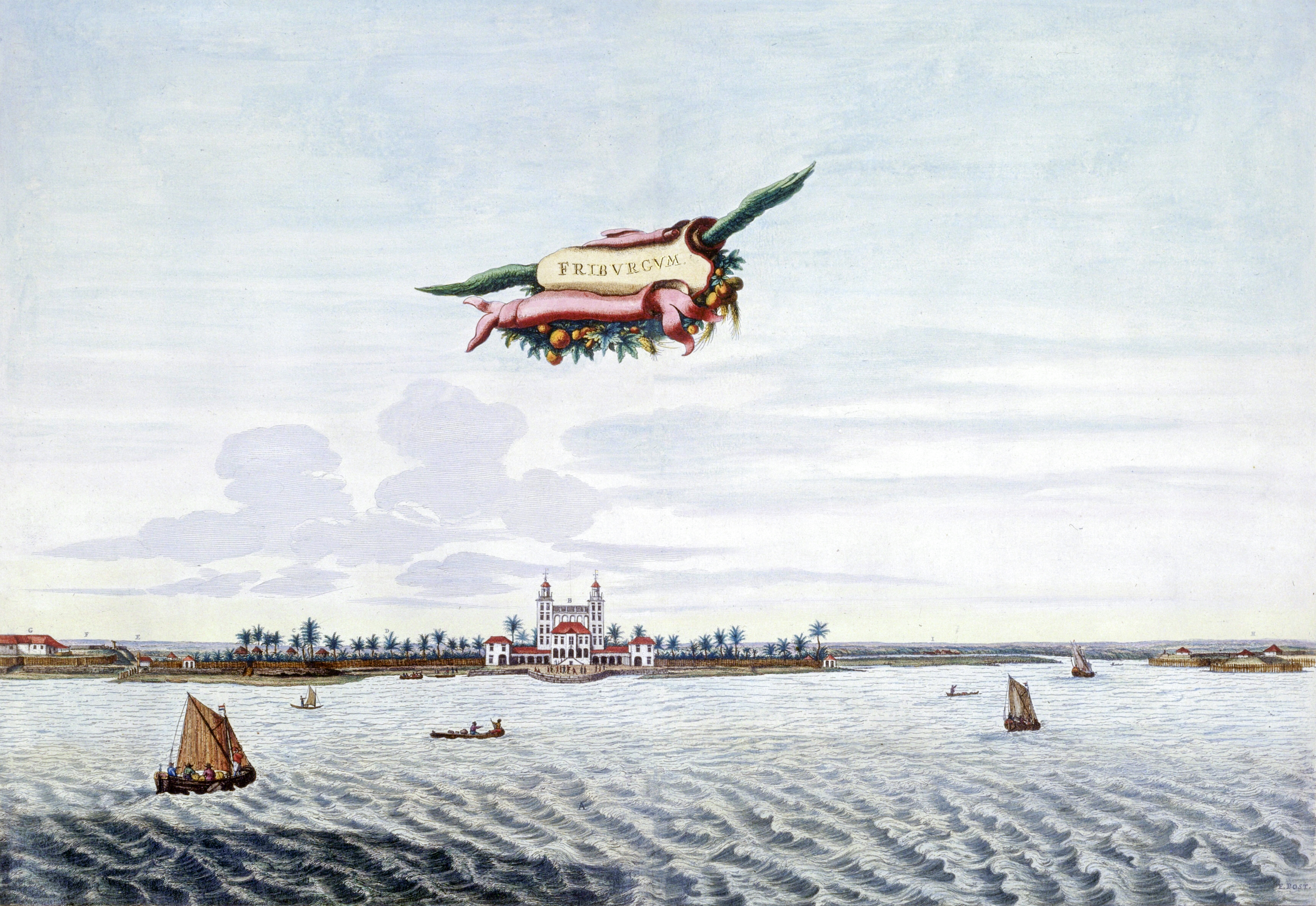
FRIBVRGVM, by Frans Post (c. 1643).

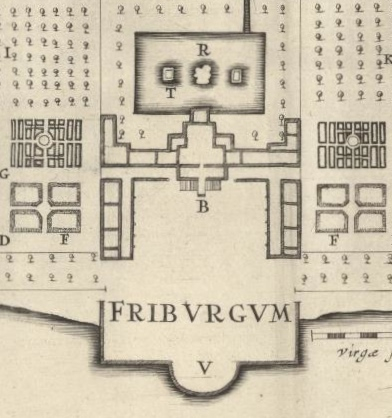
Plan of the Palace of Freiburg by Georg Marcgrave (1647).

The building was known as the Palace of the Towers because of its architecture: It had two tall, square towers with five floors, connected by a covered walkway, giving it the appearance of a church. As well as embellishing the palace, the towers served as landmarks for sailors. One of them was used as a lighthouse, visible from six leagues away, and the other as an observatory (the first to be founded in the Southern Hemisphere). The palace was protected by cannons and a large moat, and it also had Fort Ernesto in the vicinity, where the Palace of Justice and the Franciscan Convent of Santo Antônio now stand.

It had several luxurious halls, including the Hall of Honor, where one could find paintings by various artists, including Frans Post and Albert Eckhout, rich tapestries and furniture made with fine woods. There were copies of treasures of European origin that only existed in the palaces of kings or the residences of nobles of the time. The vast majority of these riches are currently scattered throughout Europe, especially in the Netherlands and France, countries to which Maurice sold a large part of his collections.

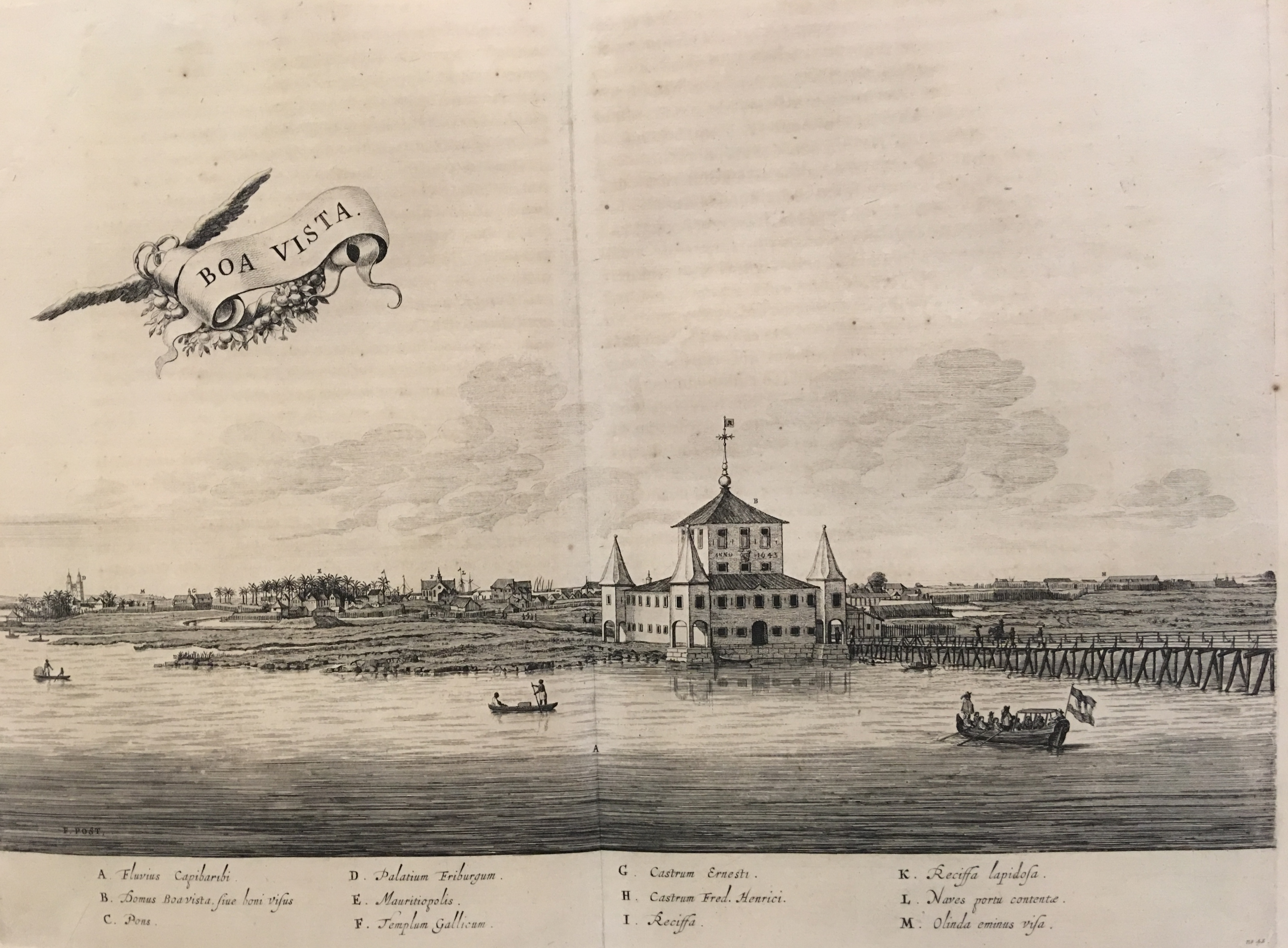
Boa Vista, by Frans Post (c. 1647), an image taken from the continent looking south-east, with a representation, on the left, of the back of the Palace of Freiburg.

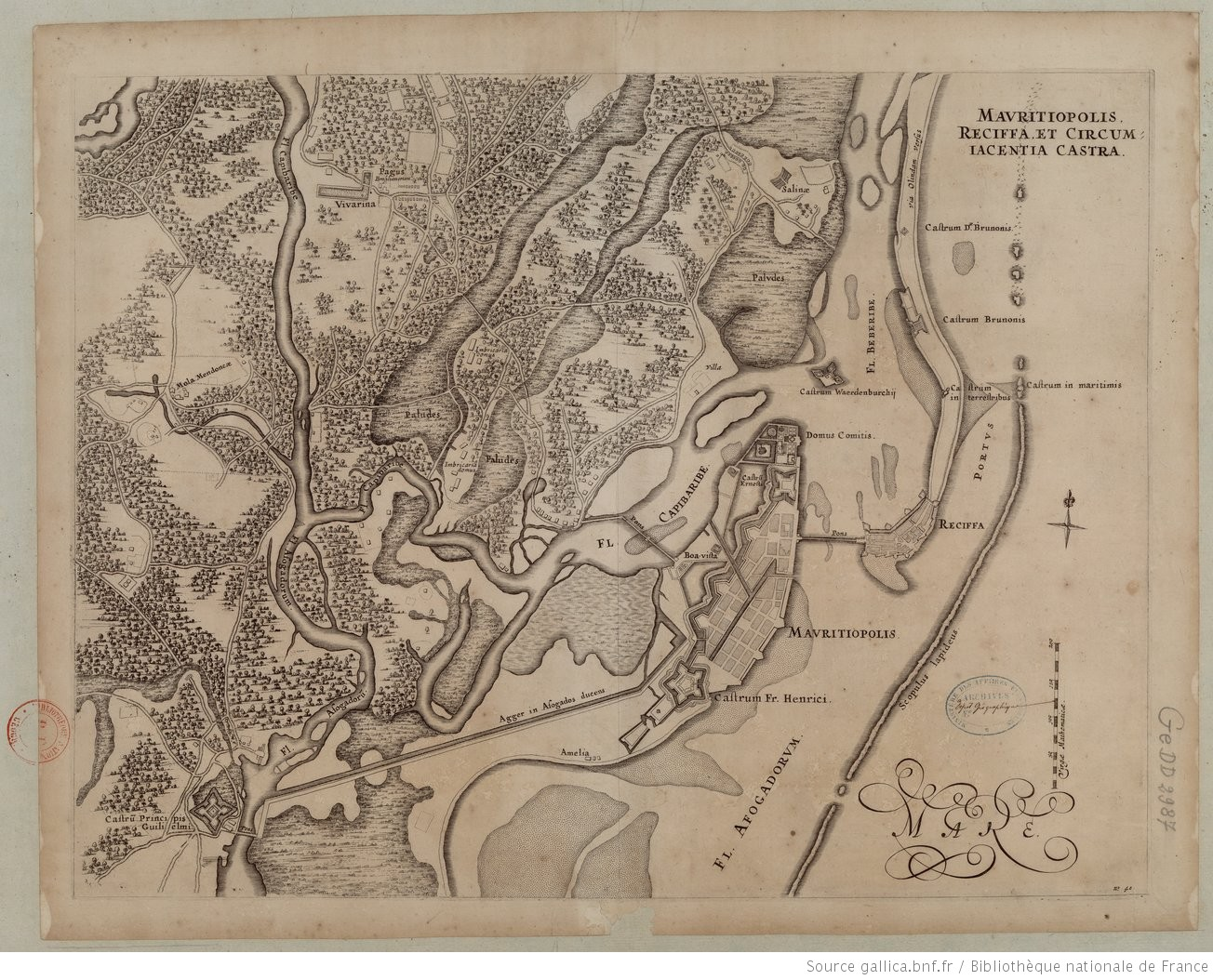
Mauritsstad by Frans Post (1612-1680), showing the position of the Palace of Freiburg.

The Palace of Friburgo was surrounded by a botanical garden, in which a wide variety of flora and fauna from the tropics were gathered, and served as a source for the first treatises on the natural history of Brazil, such as the Historia Naturalis Brasiliae by the naturalists Willem Piso and Georg Marcgrave. The botanical garden also included a large fish pond, a dovecote, various types of birds and other animals such as parrots, macaws, swans, guineafowls, peacocks, tortoises, anteaters, tapirs, rabbits, marmosets, pacas, howler monkeys, among others, most of which were donated by locals who wanted to please the count. Two thousand coconut trees were transplanted to the site, as well as other fruit trees, such as banana, orange, lemon, papaya, mango, cashew, surinam cherry, tamarind, genipap, and pomegranate trees.

Outside, between the Palace and Fort Ernesto, there was also a stable for 24 animals, a large slave quarters, a pottery workshop, a cistern and a place to hang the laundry. Festivals and meetings were held in the garden, and there were gambling and entertainment spaces in the Palace, frequented by the high society of the time.

=== Location ===
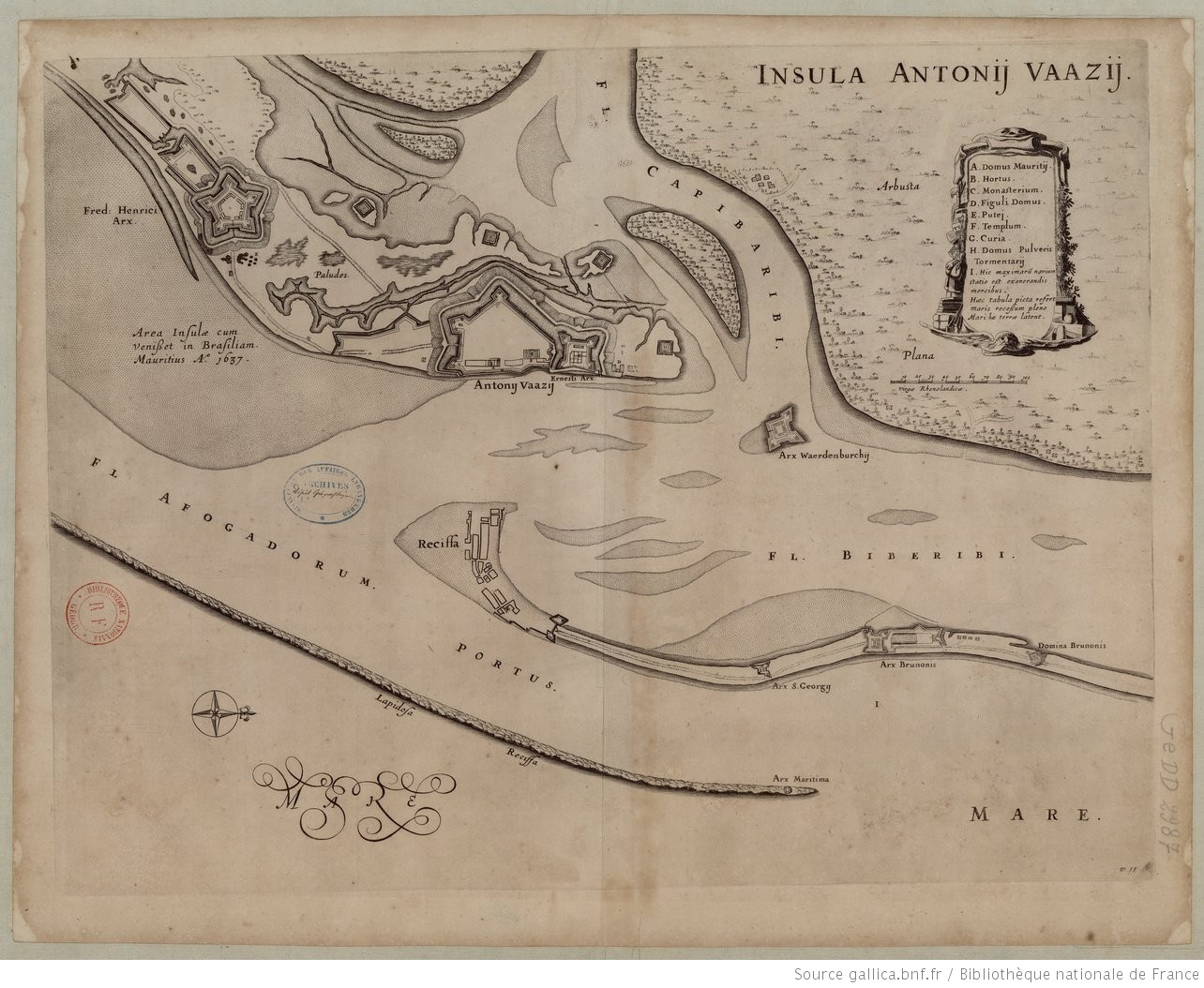
Antônio Vaz Island by Frans Post (1612-1680).

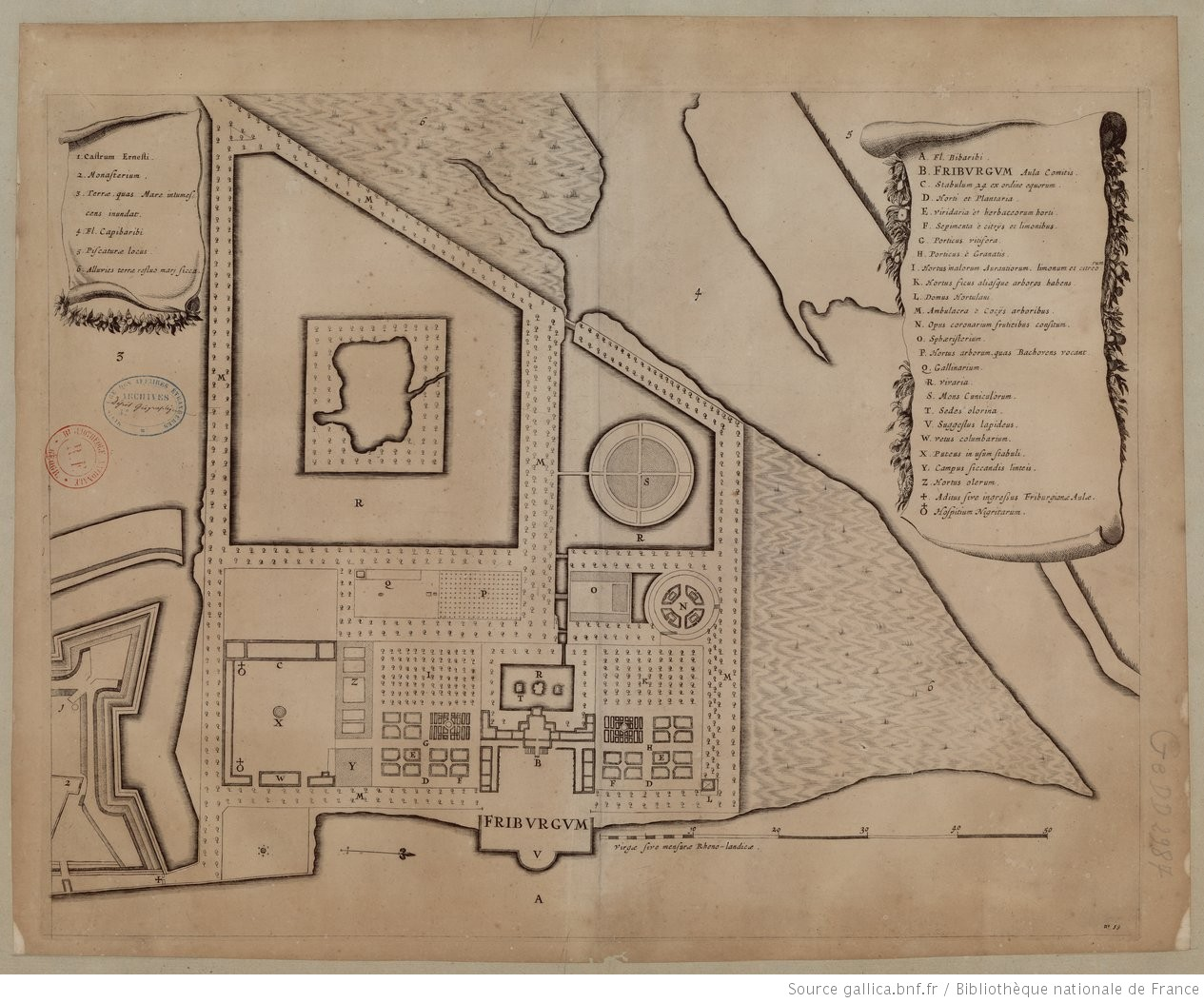
(After a 90º rotation): Position of the Palace of Friburg in Mauritsstad by Georg Marcgrave (1647), with the mouth of the River Capibaribe at the top (northwest) and Fort Ernesto, on which the Palace of Justice was built, at the left (south).

The position of the Palace of Friburgo was marked in engravings by Frans Post and Georg Marcgrave from the 1640s. It was located opposite the site where the Campo das Princesas Palace was built in the 19th century (between that site and Fort Ernesto, on which the Palace of Justice was built) and approximately opposite the site where the Santa Isabel Theater was built in the 19th century. The statue of John Maurice of Nassau-Siegen that stands in the República Square was installed in the area where the Palace of Friburgo once stood. The area of the palace, its gardens, facilities and walls therefore includes the land that today corresponds to the República Square and the facilities and gardens of the Santa Isabel Theater.

The orientation of the palace, with Recife Antigo and the sea in its front (east), and the mainland in the background (west) (at the mouth of the Capibaribe River), is also confirmed by several engravings by the same artists mentioned above; Boa Vista in particular depicting the Reduto da Boa Vista (later incorporated into the Convent of Nossa Senhora do Carmo) from the mainland (from the area of what is now Avenida Conde da Boa Vista) with the back of the Friburgo Palace to the left of the engraving.

In the 17th century, there was no Imperador Pedro II street (and its internal extension to the República Square), nor Martins de Barros avenue and the area between them, the result of later land reclamation. For this reason, both the Palace of Friburgo and the Franciscan Convent of Santo Antônio (and Fort Ernesto, built around it) were on the banks of the Capibaribe and Beberibe rivers, a probable natural mangrove area, occupied by the rectangular walled courtyard with a rounded front area of the palace.

=== Degradation and demolition ===
When John Maurice returned to the Netherlands in 1644, the site was used as a

Area originally occupied by the Palace of Friburgo, on the map of the present-day Bairro de Santo Antônio (Antônio Vaz Island) of Recife.

barracks during the battles against the Dutch, and the complex was practically destroyed by the time of the Pernambuco Insurrection in 1654. All that remained, more or less preserved, was the building, which has been restored several times and has housed several governors.

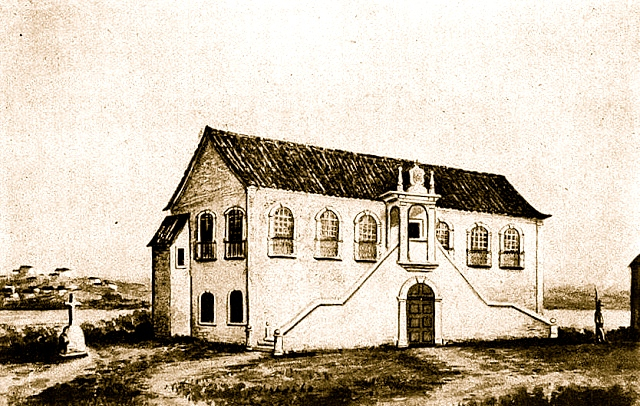
Royal Treasury of Recife in 1820. Built on part of the foundations of the Friburgo Palace.

On April 5, 1742, the Viceroy of Brazil, André de Melo e Castro, sent a letter to the governor of Pernambuco, Henrique Luís Pereira Freire, regretting that the palace had been handed over "... to the violent and careless use of the soldiers, who in a short time will reduce that factory to total dissolution, but I regret even more that, with it, a memory will also be ruined...", in what is considered to be the first and most notable action aimed at preserving historical heritage on Brazilian soil.

Between 1774 and 1787, when it was in ruins, the palace was demolished by order of the then-governor of the province, José César de Meneses. The Erário Régio was built on its place, using the foundations of the old Palácio de Friburgo on one of its sides.

== Virtual model of the Palace of Friburgo ==
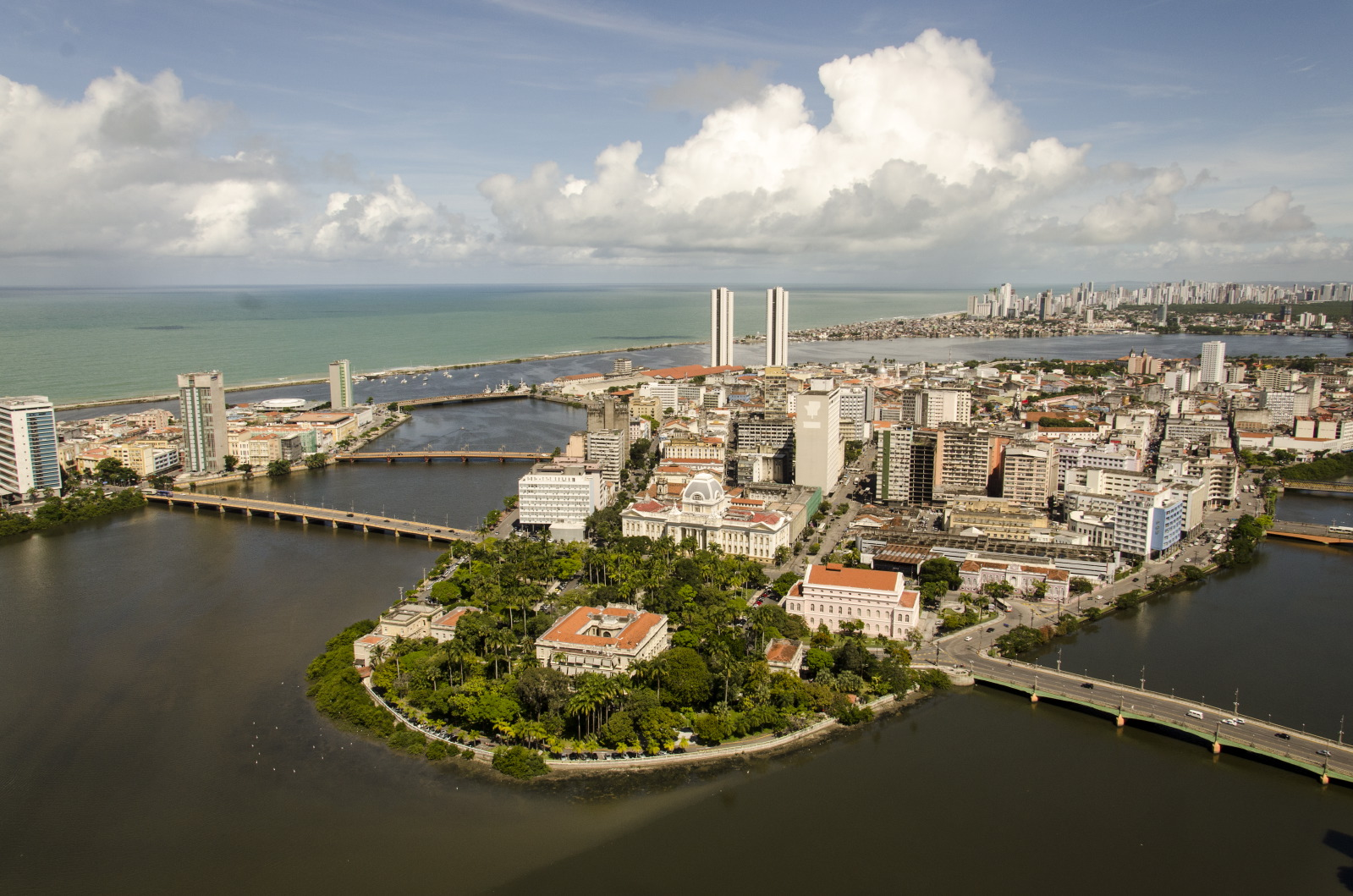
The island of Antônio Vaz, between the Palácio do Campo das Princesas, the Palace of Justice and the Santa Isabel Theater, and the República Square, set over the area of the palace and its gardens.

The virtual model of the Palace of Friburgo and its surroundings, developed between 2013 and 2015 at the request of Itaú Cultural in São Paulo, is the most modern and complete reproduction of this building, which includes paintings by Frans Post and Albert Eckhout.

== See also ==
- Mauritsstad
- Dutch Brazil
- Recife Antigo
- History of Pernambuco

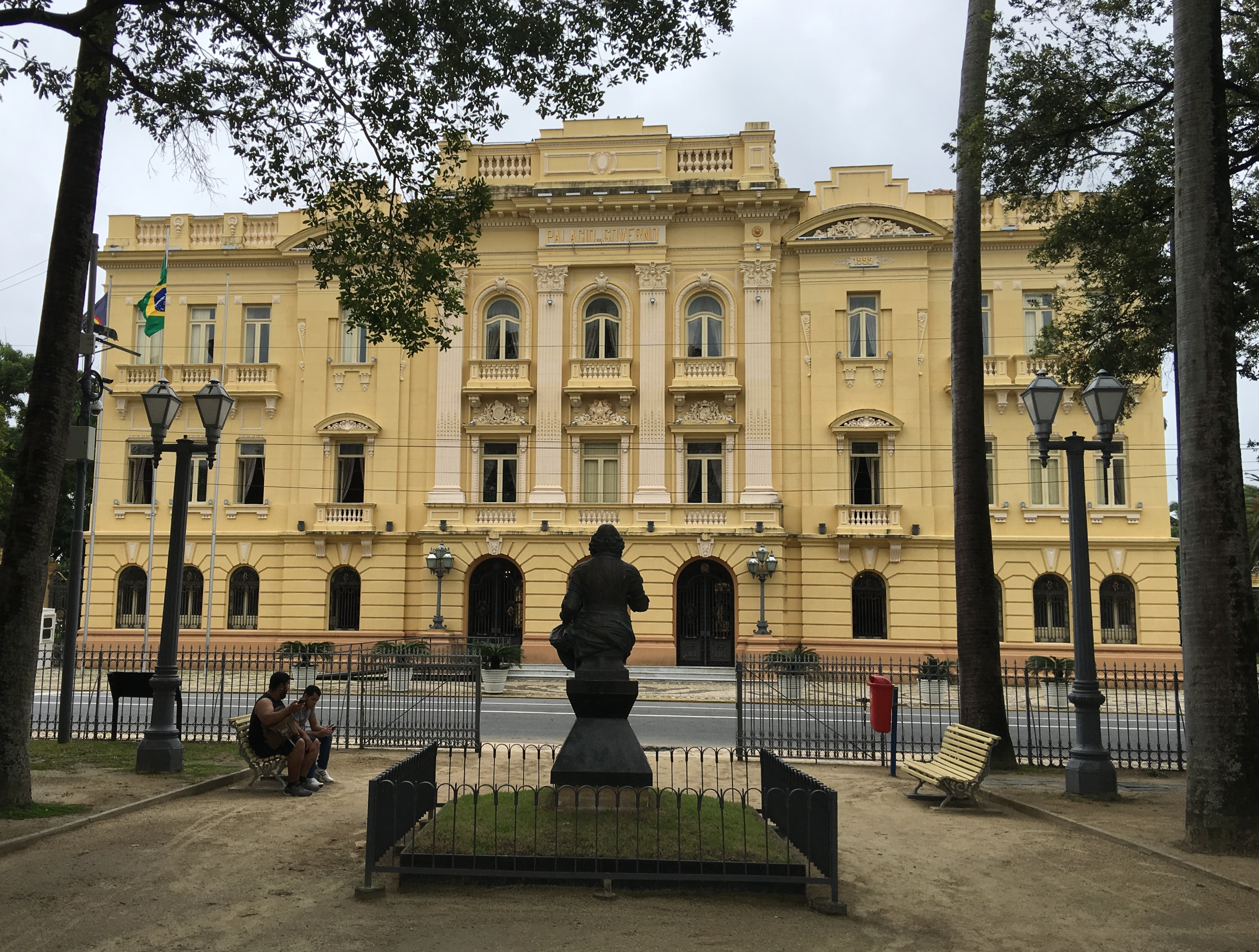
Statue of Count John Maurice in the Praça da República, in front of the Palácio do Campo das Princesas, marking the location of the Palace of Friburgo.
