= Brazilian heraldry =

- Former imperial coat of arms of Brazil
- Heraldic tradition: Portuguese
- Governing body: Cartório de Nobreza e Fidalguia (1808-1889)

Brazilian heraldry as a distinct form of heraldry dates to 1822, when Brazil became independent as an Empire, under the reign of the House of Braganza. Being formerly a part of the Portuguese Empire and being ruled by the same Royal House that reigned in Portugal, Brazilian heraldry followed the tradition of Portuguese heraldry.

== Heraldry of the nobility ==
The Brazilian nobility included Brazilians that were members of Portuguese noble lineages and Brazilian citizens ennobled during the period of the Brazilian Monarchy (1822–1889). In most cases, the concession of new arms was associated with the concession of titles. As most Brazilian armigers had Portuguese ancestors and surnames, their arms were usually taken from the arms of the corresponding Portuguese lineages.

The system of heraldry of the Brazilian non-royal nobility applies to those lineages that were not part of the Imperial Family, and includes specific coronets of rank.

Brazilian coronet rankings
Duke	Marquess	Count	Viscount	Baron

== Civic heraldry ==
Civic heraldry refers to the coat of arms borne by the government of Brazil, by its states and by its municipalities.

There are no official standards regulating civic heraldry in Brazil. However, the general standards that govern modern Portuguese municipal heraldry - established in 1930 - have been followed in most of the modern coat of arms created for Brazilian municipalities. Some older municipal coat of arms were also corrected to conform with those standards. In general, Brazilian municipal coats of arms are displayed in a round bottom shield (Portuguese shield) and are topped by a mural crown, with a scroll under the shield usually including the name of the municipality. As all Brazilian seats of municipalities have the status of "city" (in comparison with Portugal, where most still have only the status of "town"), only mural crowns with five apparent towers are generally used. Golden mural crowns are attributed to state capitals, while silver crowns are attributed to other cities. Restrictions that apply to the Portuguese municipal coat of arms regarding the inclusion of the Arms of Portugal and the division of the field in several partitions are generally ignored in Brazil. Also, many Brazilian municipal coats of arms include a motto in the scroll under the shield, which is rare in Portugal (although allowed). Besides this, a number of Brazilian municipal coats of arms include supporters, whose application is not foreseen in the Portuguese municipal heraldry standards.

The majority of the coats of arms of Brazilian states were adopted in the late 19th century and do not follow heraldic standards. The same applies to the modern coat of arms of Brazil, adopted after the implementation of the republic in 1889.

Brazilian civic mural crowns
Capital	City	Town	Village

== Imperial heraldry ==
Imperial heraldry refers to the coats of arms of the members of the Brazilian imperial family, including the Monarchs, the consorts and princes.

Brazilian imperial family members heraldic system
Emperor or Empress regnant	Prince Imperial and Prince of Grão-Pará	Head of the Imperial House of Brazil (post-monarchic period)	Prince Imperial and Prince of Orléans-Braganza (post-monarchic period)

== Brazilian coats of arms ==
=== National ===
Coat of arms of the United Kingdom of Portugal, Brazil and the Algarves, with the armillary sphere representing Brazil.

Coat of arms of the Kingdom of Brazil within the United Kingdom of Portugal, Brazil and the Algarves

Coat of arms of the Kingdom of Brazil, after the declaration of independence

Coat of arms of the Empire of Brazil

Coat of arms of the First Brazilian Republic

Modern coat of arms of the Federal Republic of Brazil

=== Brazilian Imperial Family ===
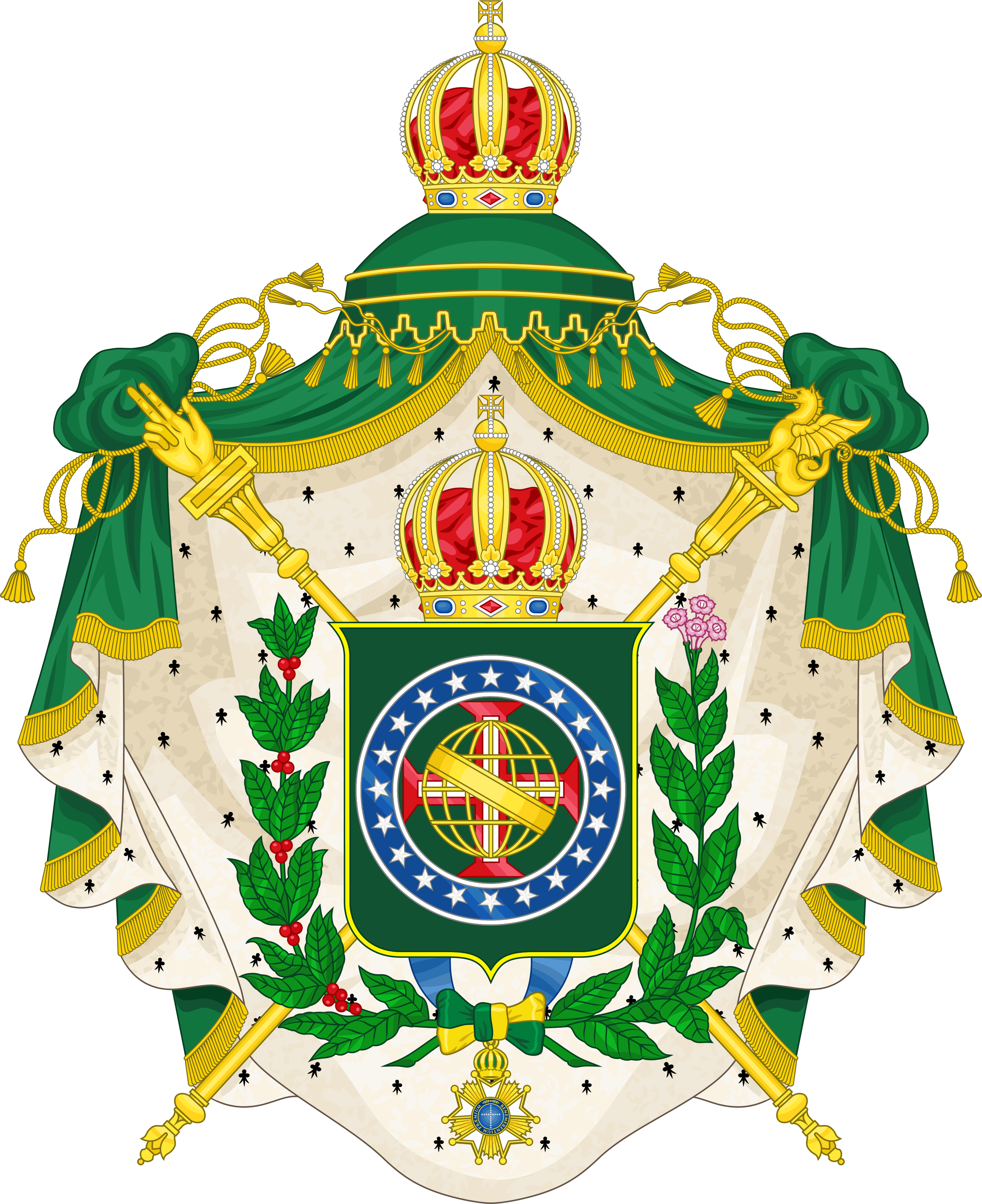
Coat of arms of the Emperor of Brazil

Coat of arms of Maria Leopoldina of Austria, empress of Brazil

Coat of arms of Isabel, Princess Imperial of Brazil

Coat of arms of Maria Amélia, princess of Brazil

=== Brazilian nobility ===
Coat of arms of the count of Porto Alegre

Coat of arms of the duke of Caxias

Coat of arms of the duke of Santa Cruz

Coat of arms of the viscount of Rio Branco

Coat of arms of the marquess of Paraná

Coat of arms of the viscount of Beaurepaire-Rohan

=== Brazilian states ===
Coat of arms of the state of Acre

Coat of arms of the state of Bahia

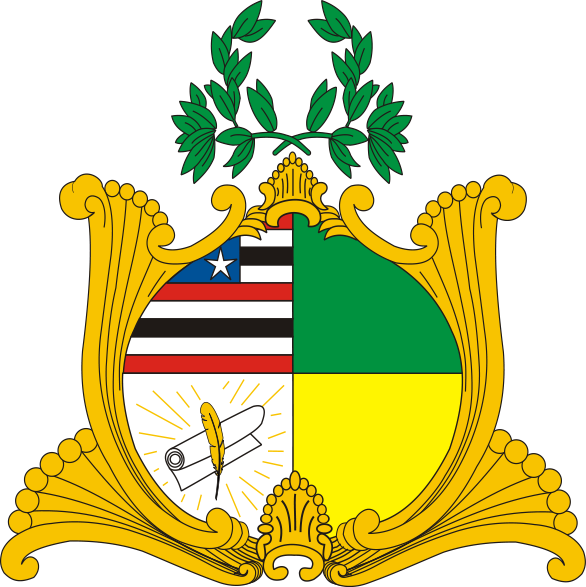
Coat of arms of the state of Maranhão

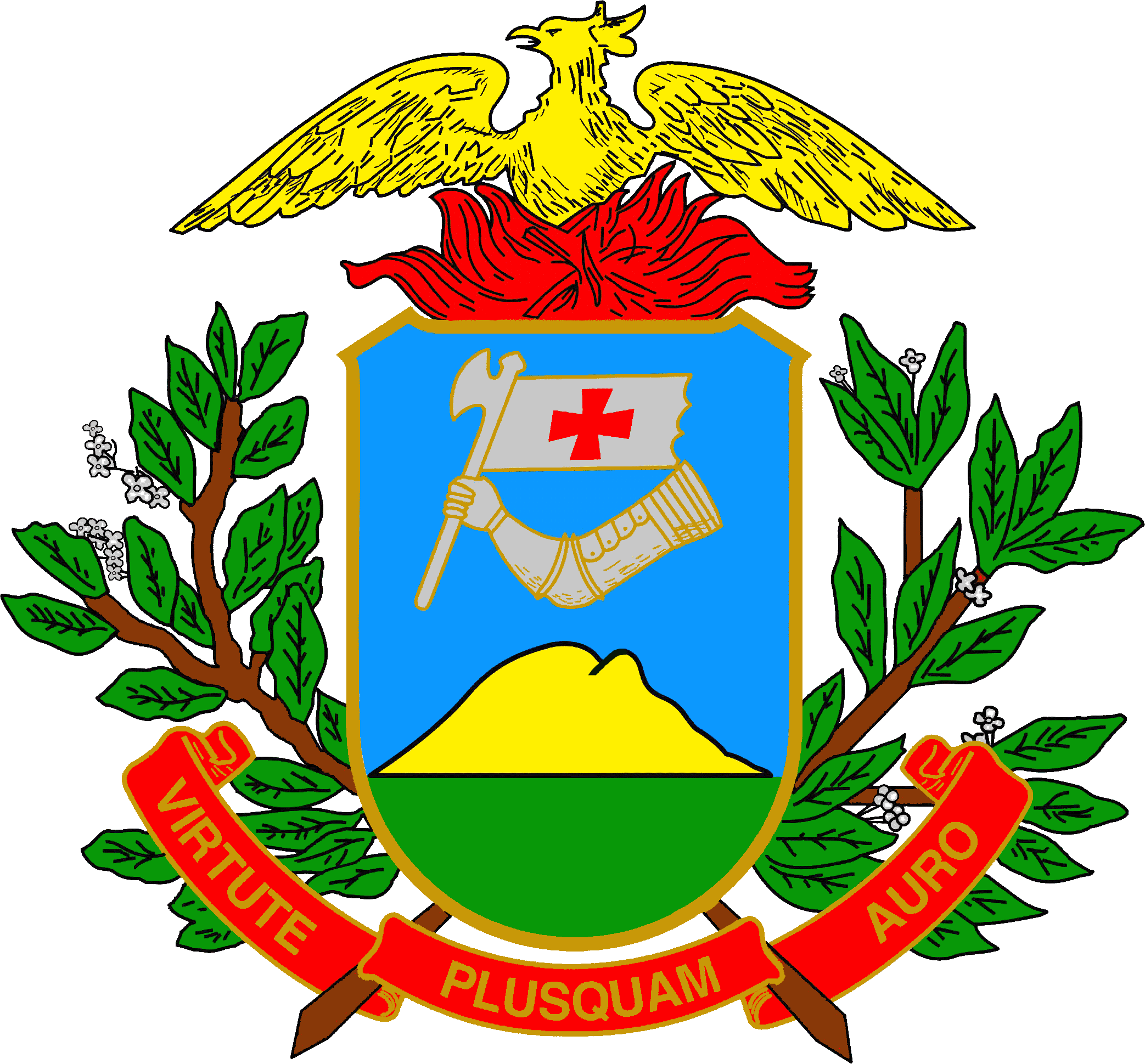
Coat of arms of the state of Mato Grosso

Coat of arms of the state of Mato Grosso do Sul

Coat of arms of the state of Minas Gerais

Coat of arms of the state of Pará

Coat of arms of the state of Paraná

Coat of arms of the state of Pernambuco

Coat of arms of the state of Rio Grande do Sul

Coat of arms of the state of Santa Catarina

Coat of arms of the state of São Paulo

=== Brazilian municipalities ===
Coat of arms of the municipality of Rio de Janeiro

Coat of arms of the municipality of São Paulo

Coat of arms of the municipality of Santos

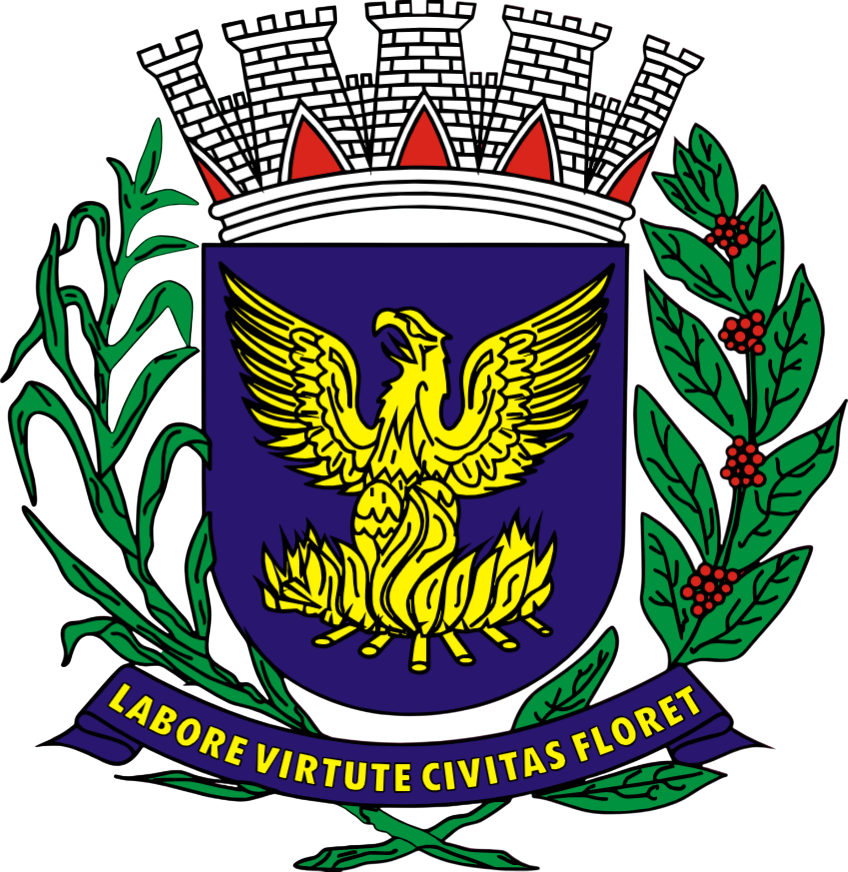
Coat of arms of the municipality of Campinas

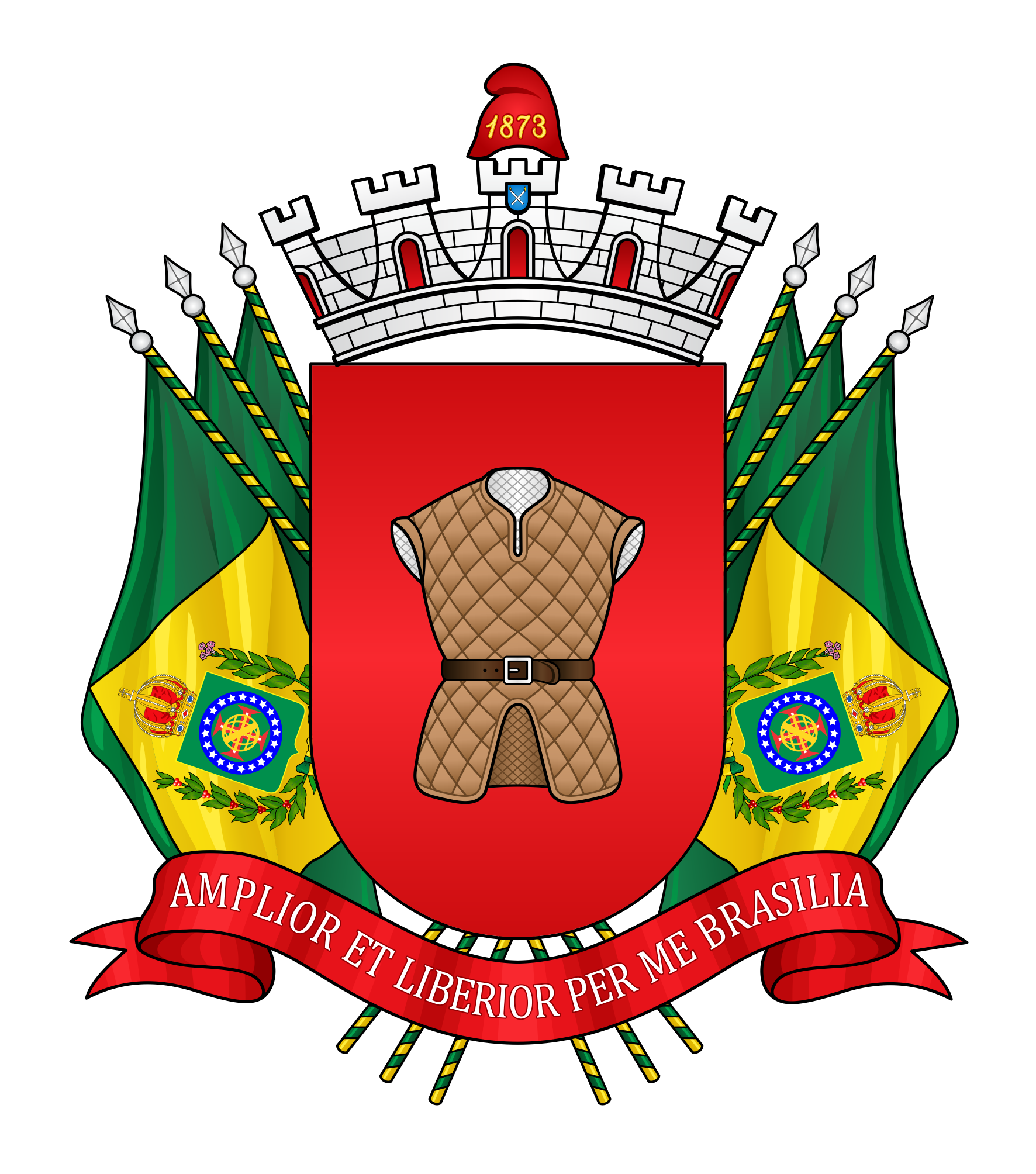
Coat of arms of the municipality of Itu

Coat of arms of the municipality of Salvador

=== Armed forces ===
Coat of arms of the Brazilian Air Force

Coat of arms of the Brazilian Army

Coat of arms of the Brazilian Navy

Coat of arms of the Brazilian Marine Corps

=== Universities ===
Coat of arms of the University of São Paulo

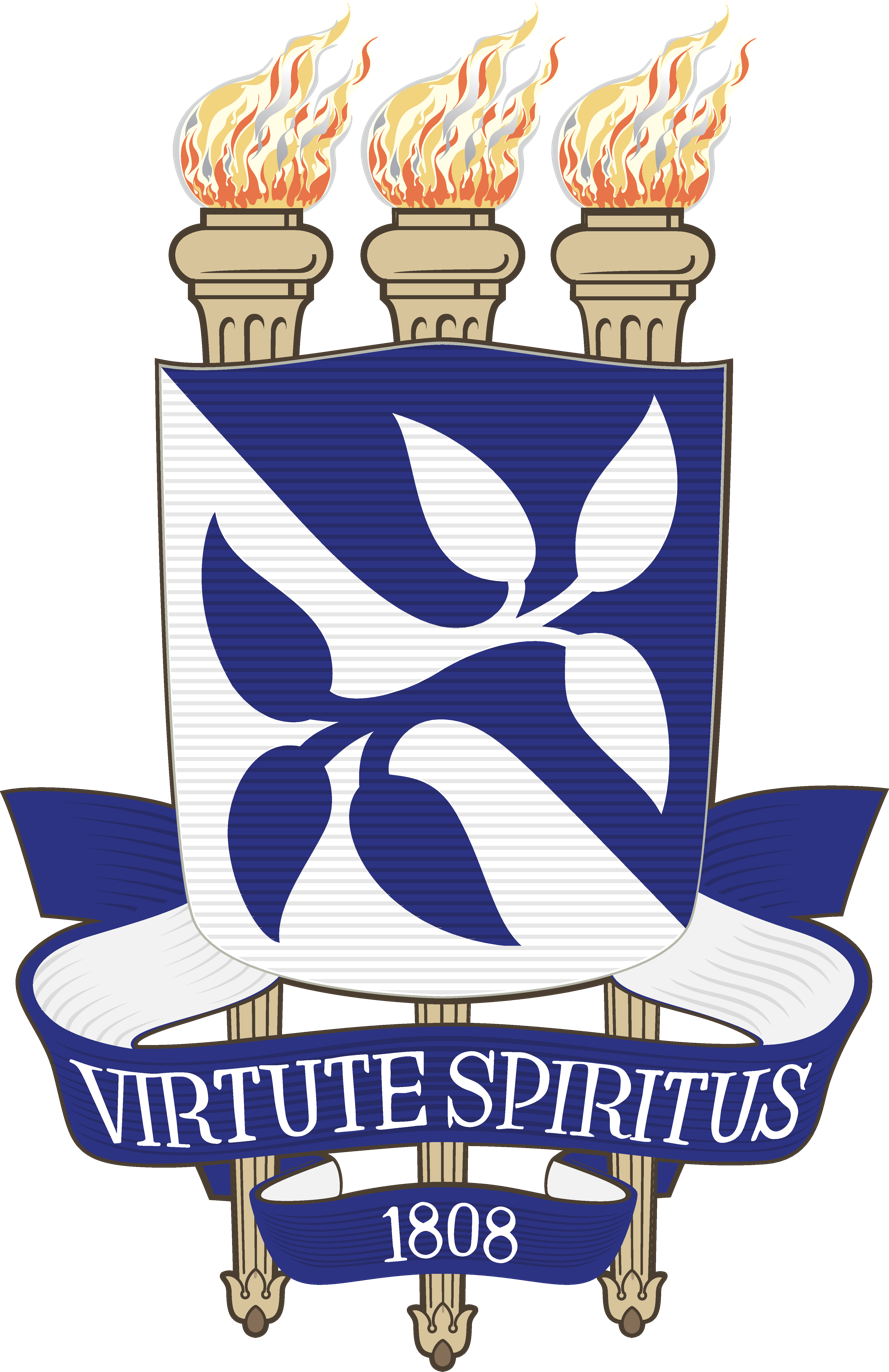
Coat of arms of the Federal University of Bahia

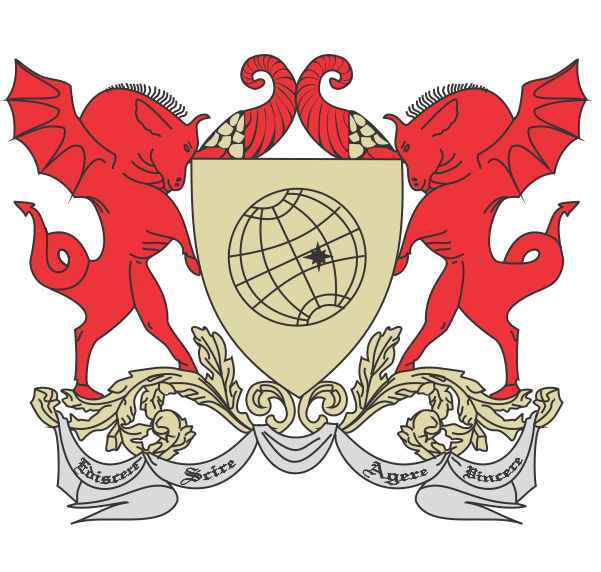
Coat of arms of the Federal University of Viçosa

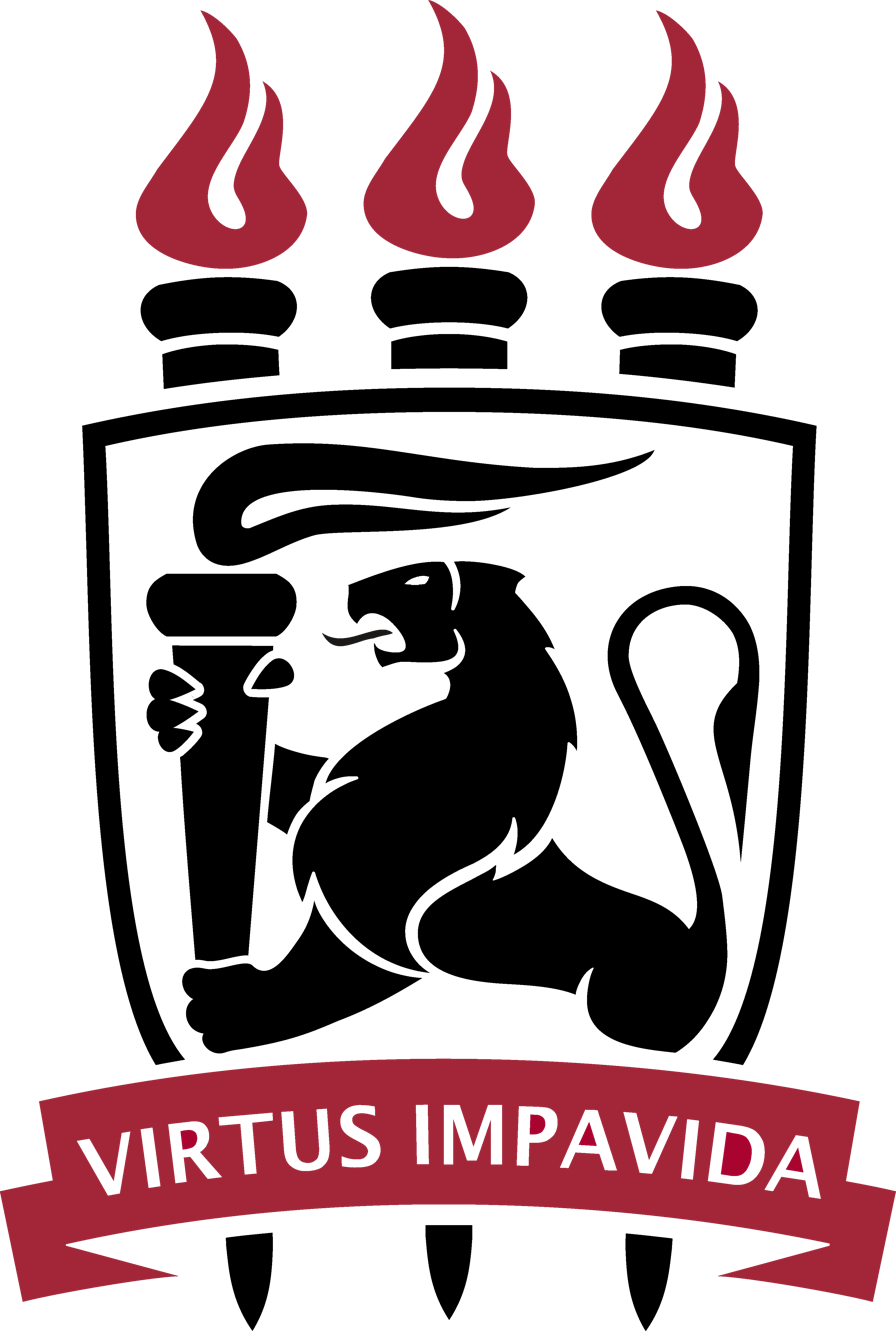
Coat of arms of the Federal University of Pernambuco

== See also ==
- Coat of arms of Brazil
- Portuguese heraldry
- Brazilian nobility
