= Hendrick Lonck =

16/17th-century Dutch sea captain and naval hero

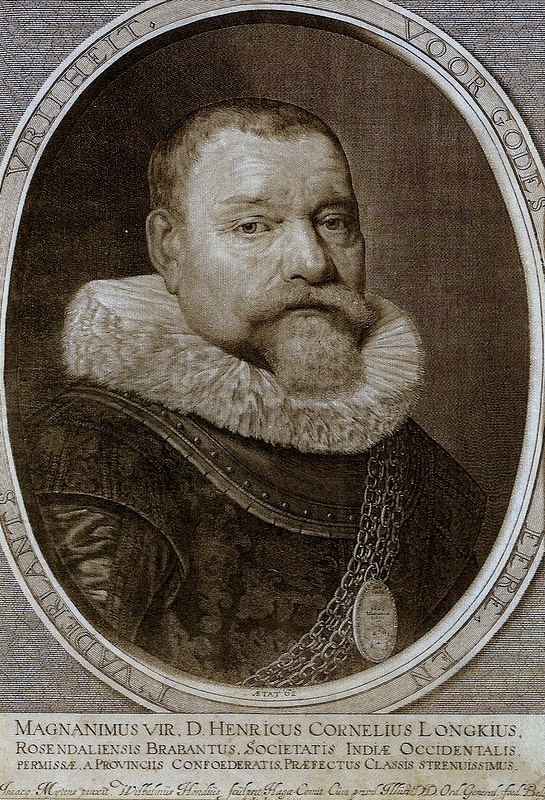
Hendrick Corneliszoon Lonck

Adm. Hendrick Corneliszoon Lonck (or Loncque and Loncq) (born 1568, Roosendaal – 10 October 1634, Amsterdam) was a Dutch naval hero, being the first Dutch sea captain to reach the New World.

== Biography ==
He was born in Roosendaal in the southern Netherlands, of Brabant origin. His parents were Cornelis Pieterszoon Lonck and Dichna Heinrich. He was a full cousin of the Zeeland Vice Admiral Cornelis Symons Son Loncque. In 1604, he married Grietgen Lenaerts in Antwerp.

In 1606, Lonck captained the Witte Leeuw (White Lion), a 320-ton merchant ship armed for war, and approached the Gulf of St. Lawrence. Near Tadoussac, he boarded two of Pierre Dugua, Sieur de Mons' ships, pillaging them for cannons, furs, mounts, and munitions.

In 1623 and 1624, Lonck participated in the expedition of Admiral Willem de Zoete against the Barbary Coast pirates. Having made admiral by 1628, Lonck, in the service of the Dutch West Indies Company, joined Admiral Piet Hein in the Battle in the Bay of Matanzas, a naval battle during the Eighty Years' War in which a Dutch squadron was able to defeat and capture a Spanish treasure fleet.

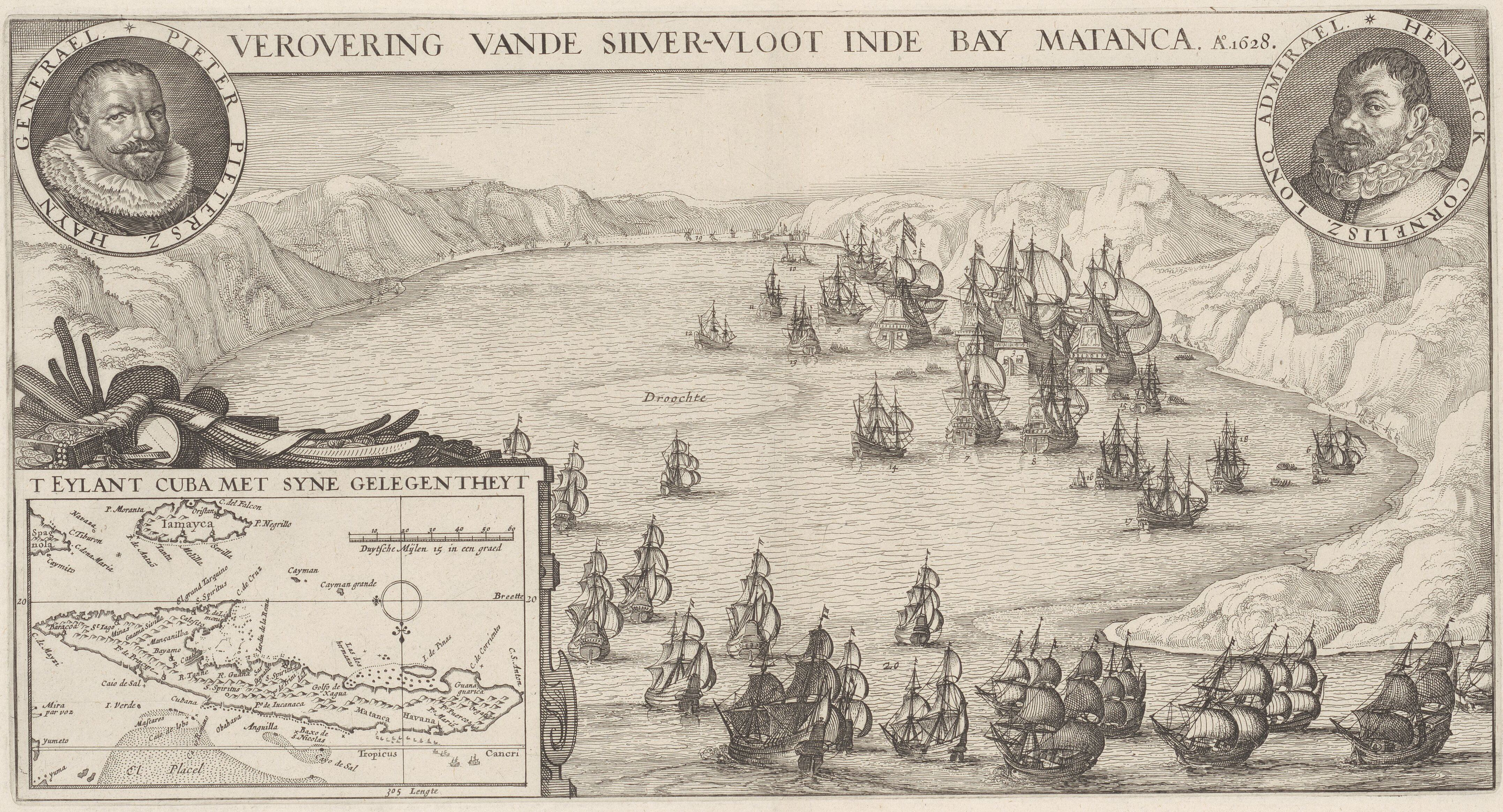
Commemorative print with Lonck (right) and Piet Hein (left) with the 1628 battle in the bay of Matanzas and map of Cuba

Lonck replaced Hein in 1629 as captain-general. In 1630, he commanded a Dutch colonizing expedition of 52 ships, 15 sloops, and 3,780 sailors that captured the historic city of Olinda, Brazil on 14 February, followed by the capture of the Brazilian state of Pernambuco after a feeble resistance by Matias de Albuquerque, its Portuguese Governor. It was to be his last voyage, returning to the Netherlands on 20 July 1630.

He died in Amsterdam and was buried on 10 October 1634 in the Oude Kerk in Amsterdam.
