= Recapture of Recife (1652–1654) =

Military action

- Part of the Dutch invasions of Brazil
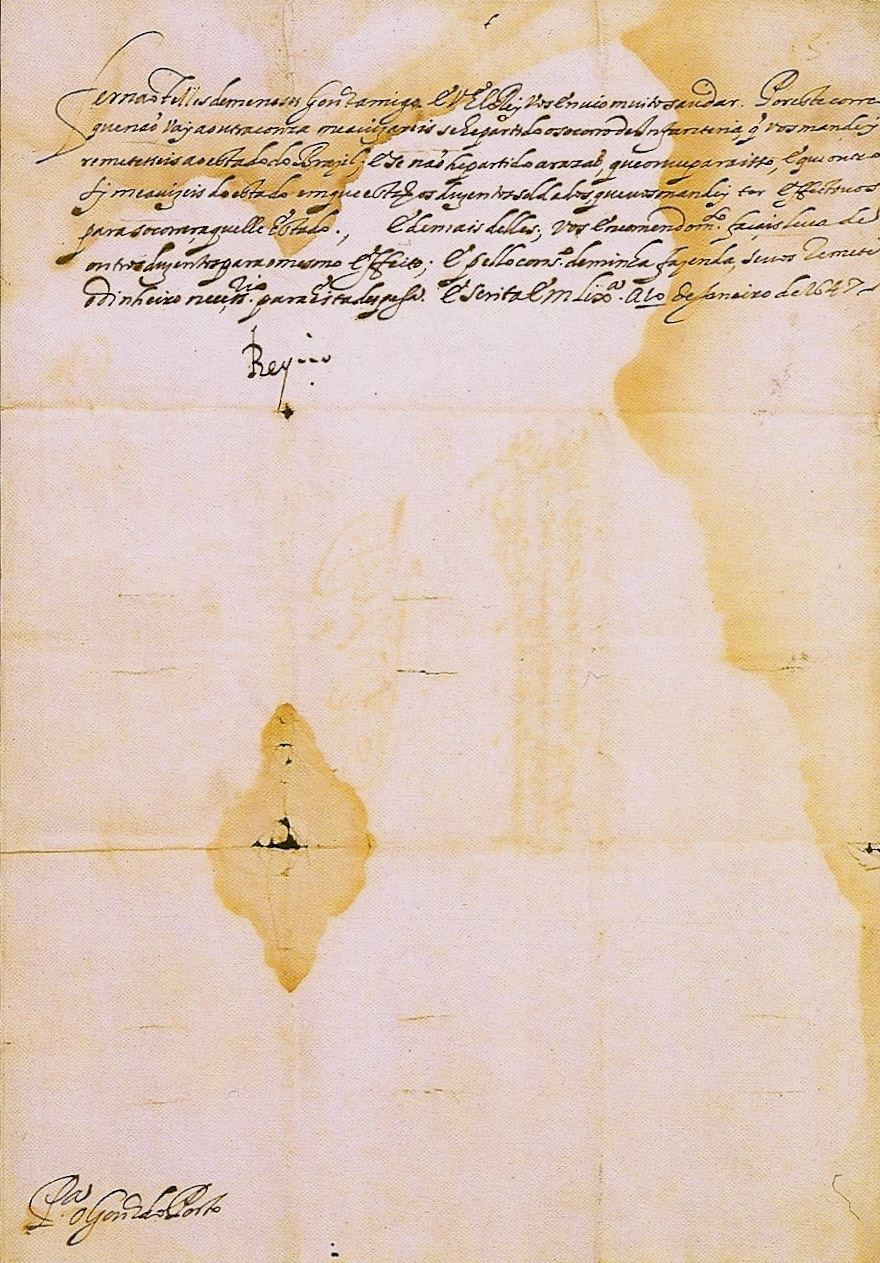
- A letter written by the Portuguese King John IV ordering the attack on Recife
| Date | May 1652 – January 1654 |
| Location | Pernambuco, Brazil |
| Result | Portuguese victory |
| Territorial changes | Disestablishment of Dutch Brazil |

Belligerents
| Portugal | Dutch West India Company |

Commanders and leaders
| Barreto de Meneses; Pedro Jacques | Walter Van Loo |

Strength
| 2,500 men | Unknown; remnants of the Dutch forces as well as the other garrisons of Dutch Brazil |

Casualties and losses
| Unknown | Unknown |

The Recapture of Recife (or the second siege of Recife) was a military campaign by Portuguese forces under Francisco Barreto de Meneses against Dutch forces of Captain Walter Van Loo. After the Dutch defeats at Guararapes, their surviving men, as well as other garrisons of New Holland, made a last stand at Mauritsstad (modern-day Recife). The Portuguese defeated them in fierce fighting. The victorious Portuguese entered Recife on 28 January 1654, putting an end to New Holland.

== Background ==
Portugal had declared independence from Spain in 1640, but the conflict with the Dutch continued. In 1644 the Dutch West India Company (GWC) recalled governor Johan Maurits, due to excessive military expenditures. Soon after, the GWC faced a major uprising of Portuguese planters in June 1645. The Portuguese planters around Pernambuco had never fully accepted Dutch rule, and had also resented the high interest rates charged by Dutch moneylenders for loans to rebuild their plantations following the initial Dutch conquest. In August, the planters revolted and prevailed over Dutch forces in a minor battle fought outside Recife, effectively ending Dutch control over the hinterland of the colony. That year, the Portuguese gained Várzea, Sirinhaém, Pontal de Nazaré, the Fort of Porto Calvo, and Fort Maurits. By 1646, the GWC only controlled four toeholds along the Brazilian coast, chief among them being Recife.

In the spring of 1646, the Dutch sent a relief expedition to Recife of 20 ships with 2,000 men, temporarily forestalling the fall of the city. In 1647, in return for agreeing to the Peace of Munster with Spain, the Dutch province of Zeeland induced the other Dutch provinces to support a second, larger relief expedition to reconquer Brazil. The expedition, consisting of 41 ships with 6,000 men, set sail on December 26, 1647.

In Brazil, the Dutch had already abandoned Itamaracá on December 13, 1647. The new expeditionary force arrived late at Recife, with many of its soldiers either dead or mutinous from lack of pay. In April 1648, the Portuguese routed the expeditionary force at the First Battle of Guararapes, fought outside Recife. The Portuguese had sent an armada of 84 ships, including 18 warships, to recapture Recife. In February 1649, the Portuguese again routed the Dutch at the Second Battle of Guararapes.

== Fall of Recife ==
After the Dutch defeats at Guararapes, the remnants of the expeditionary force and other garrisons of New Holland made a last stand in Recife. After a two-year siege, the city fell on 28 January 1654. The remaining Dutch forces were expelled, putting an end to Dutch Brazil.
