= Francisco I of Matamba =

Dom Francisco I of Matamba, often referred to as Francisco Guterres Ngola Kanini, was a king of the African kingdom of Matamba.

== Life ==
He was among the pro-Catholic, pro-Portuguese faction at Matamba, which stood at odds with the Imbangala faction, who made up a considerable part of the army. After the death of Queen Nzinga, Matamba descended into civil-war between the supporters of her sister queen Bárbara and the Imbangala units led by her husband, António Carrasco Njinga Amona. Carrasco usurped power but Francisco killed him in battle in 1680. He secured the throne of Matamba and founded the dynasty that would rule the kingdom until the 19th century. He initially sought a close relationship with Portuguese Angola, but after realizing that governor João da Silva e Sousa favoured relations with the Imbangala Kingdom of Kasanje, he declared war on both Portugal and Kasanje.

In 1680 king Francisco allied with a rebellious lord of Kasanje, attacked the kingdom and raided Portuguese caravans. King Pascoal of Kasanje died shortly after repelling a Matamba incursion but as the election for his successor was disputed, civil-war erupted in Kasanje. Matamba forces led by Francisco invaded Matamba and forcibly placed Luís Ndala Kingo a Hanga on the throne but he was overthrown by Kinguri Kia Kasanje in a counter-rebellion soon after king Francisco had withdrawn with his troops from Kasanje. The governor of Angola João da Silva e Sousa declared war on Matamba in August 1681 and dispatched a 40,000 men army which was joined by Kinguri kia Kasanje.

At the Battle of Katole, the Portuguese were ambushed and the Portuguese commander Luís Lopes de Sequeira was killed in action, but the Portuguese officers managed to rally the troops and secure victory through a counter-attack. King Francisco also died in battle and was succeeded by his sister Verónica, who signed a pact of vassalage to Portugal two years later on 7 September 1683, in effect putting an end to the Angolan Wars.

== See also ==
- Angolan Wars
- History of Angola
- List of rulers of Matamba
