= Precolonial history of Angola =

History of angola prior to colonisation

The precolonial history of Angola lasted until Portugal annexed the territory as a colony in 1655.

== Old Stone Age ==
The earliest inhabitants of the Angola area are believed to have been Khoisan hunter-gatherers whose remains date back to the Old Stone Age.

Based on archaeological and linguistic evidence, scholars believe that beginning in the last centuries BCE, people speaking languages of the Western Bantu family entered the country and introduced agriculture and iron working. Studies of DNA from Cabinda have found no traces of any population groups other than the Bantu in the modern day population. They expected to find evidence of combined ancestry. This makes it difficult to explain the existence of an earlier population, save that they were completely and rapidly replaced by the Bantu speakers without intermarriage (although intermarriage may have occurred in the central parts of Angola). Also, part of the Khoisan withdrew to what is now Southern Angola as well as Northern Botswana and Northern Namibia, where significant groups are still living.

== 15th century ==
The Portuguese established themselves on the west coast of Africa towards the close of the 15th century. Diogo Cão found the Kongo Kingdom and the Congo River in 1482. He erected a stone pillar at the mouth of the river, which accordingly took the title of Rio do Padrão. He exchanged hostages with the local people, who reported that the country was subject to a great monarch, Manikongo or lord of the Kingdom of Kongo, resident at Mbanza Kongo. He reached the Angolan coast in 1484.

The Portuguese entered into a cooperative relationship with the rulers of Kongo. Gonçalo de Sousa was dispatched on a formal embassy in 1491; and the first missionaries entered the country in his train. King Nzinga Nkuwu of Kongo was baptized at this time, taking the name of João in honor of the king of Portugal. The Kongo adopted Catholicism. Other states existing at that time included Kongo dia Nlaza and Nziko located to Kongo's east, Ndongo, in the highlands between the Kwanza and Lukala Rivers, the Kingdom of Benguela, located on the front range of the Bihe Plateau, and Songo located south of Ndongo.

== 16th century ==
King Afonso I, also known as Mvemba a Nzinga, son of King Nzinga Nkuwu, established Christianity as the national religion by 1520. In 1595, the Pope declared Kongo to be an episcopal see. The principal church, built in 1548 and dedicated to the Savior (São Salvador), was named as cathedral, whose jurisdiction included both Kongo and the Portuguese colony of Angola.

Portugal had several missions to Kongo's southern neighbor, Ndongo, the first of which was dispatched in 1520, but failed and was withdrawn. A second mission was sent to Ndongo in 1560 led by Paulo Dias de Novais and including Jesuit priests. Dias de Novais returned to Portugal in 1564, leaving the Jesuit Francisco de Gouveia in Ndongo. While in Portugal, Dias de Novais secured a grant allowing him to colonize the country. In exchange for agreeing to raise private funds to finance his expedition, bring Portuguese colonists and build forts in the country, the crown gave him rights to conquer and rule the sections south of the Kwanza River.

Early Portuguese activity in Angola and adjacent regions, c. 1500-1800

Dias de Novais arrived in Angola with an armed force and more Jesuit priests. Originally he planned to offer his small force as a mercenary reinforcement to Ndongo and to Kongo for their various wars. After indifferent success, a Portuguese who had long resided in Congo, Francisco Barbuda, persuaded the king of Ndongo that Portugal intended to take his country over. Acting on this intelligence, the king ordered the Portuguese to be killed and expelled. In 1579 therefore, Ndongo made a sudden and devastating war on the Portuguese (and their many servants and slaves, many of whom were from Kongo) and drove them from Ndongo back to a few holdings in the region around Luanda. The Portuguese were aided in their defense by Kongo, whose king Álvaro I, sent a large army in his support and to attack Ndongo in revenge for the slaughter of Kongo slaves. Although Kongo's army was defeated trying to cross the Bengo River and ran out of supplies, Dias de Novais managed to hold on to Luanda and the small fort of Nzele on the Kwanza River.

From 1575 to 1589 when he died, Dias de Novais sought to recover and expand Portuguese possessions in the Kwanza Valley. He did so largely by making alliances with local rulers who were disaffected with Ndongo rule, notably the ruler (soba) of Muxima. In this effort, Portuguese managed to take over the province of Ilamba located between the Kwanza and Bengo Rivers, and in a hard-fought battle in 1582, founded the post at Massangano at the confluence of the Kwanza and Lucala Rivers. Emboldened by victories over Ndongo armies in 1583 and 1585, Dias de Novais' lieutenant Luis Serrão, who took over the colony following Dias de Novais' death in 1589 led an attack on Ndongo's capital at Kabasa. This attack, however, was a spectacular failure, as Ndongo, allied with its neighbor Matamba crushed the Portuguese army and drove it back to Massangano.

The following period was a stalemate, capped by a peace agreement in 1599. Portuguese governors in the interim, finding themselves too weak to attack Ndongo, were content with engaging in political wrangling with the kingdom and with seeking opportunities to use its own political conflicts to their advantage.

== 17th century ==
Around 1600, Portuguese merchants working on the coast south of the Kwanza River encountered Imbangala bands that were then ravaging the Kingdom of Benguela, overlord in the region. These Imbangala were prepared to sell captives they had taken in their wars to the Portuguese in exchange for European goods. In around 1615, Portuguese governors invited some of these bands to cross the Kwanza and serve in their armies. Governor Luis Mendes de Vasconcelos used these bands to good effect, when, beginning in 1618 he used them to buttress his armies and local rebels to attack Ndongo. Over the next three years, he expelled the king of Ndongo from his capital at Kabasa, forcing him to take refuge on the Kindonga Islands in the Kwanza River, captured members of the royal family, sent expeditionary forces as far inland as Matamba, and captured and exported as many as 50,000 people as slaves to Brazil and the Spanish Indies. The first Africans to arrive in the North American English colony of Virginia were taken from these captives, by English privateers attacking shipping.

In 1617, the Imbangala allied with the Portuguese in invading Ndongo. The Imbangala took control of the Kwango valley, forming a new kingdom. The Imbangala and expanded trade with regional neighbors, selling salt for goods, and with the Portuguese, selling slaves. King or Ngola Nzinga of Ndongo traveled to Luanda in 1623 and successfully negotiated for peace. The Portuguese administrator in charge of Angola adopted Nzinga as his goddaughter, giving her the Christian name Dona Ana de Souza. Peace with Portugal however, did not affect poor relations between the Imbangala and Ndongo kingdoms. The Imbangala continued to attack and kidnap Ndongo civilians, selling them into slavery. Portugal intervened militarily, ostensibly on Nzinga's behalf, and she and many Kimbundu retreated east to Matamba. There she established a new Kimbundu kingdom and prepared for war with the Portuguese. The Portuguese declared Ari Kiluanji the new ngola (paramount ruler) as head of the Ndongo. Kiluanji lacked political and religious legitimacy in the eyes of many Kimbundu who revolted against the new establishment with encouragement from Nzinga.

In the aftermath of the war, the king of Ndongo sent his sister Njinga Mbandi to Luanda to negotiate a peace treaty in 1622. The Imbangala bands had not proved as obedient as the Portuguese hoped and were ravaging far and wide among both Ndongo's lands and those controlled by Portugal. In the terms of the agreement Njinga negotiated, Portugal agreed to withdraw a fort at Ambaca which Mendes de Vasconcelos had founded as a base for his operations against Ndongo, and to return a large number of serfs (kijiko) he had captured, to help in restraining the Imbangala operating in Ndongo, and allow the king to return to his traditional capital. In exchange Ndongo would swear vassalage to Portugal and pay 100 slaves per year as tribute. However, none of these conditions were actually met.

Mendes de Vasconcelos' successor, João Correia de Sousa agreed to the terms of the treaty, in part because he hoped to repeat his predecessors war with Imbangala help against Kongo. In 1622 he led a bloody campaign against the territory of Kasanze, located near Luanda and under Kongo's authority, then claiming that the Kongo subordinate of Nambu a Ngongo harbored runaway slaves, he invaded that region, and finally, upset that the Kongo electors had chosen Pedro II the former Duke of Mbamba to be king of Kongo, invaded Mbamba itself. In November, 1622, he met a hastily gathered Kongo army at the Battle of Mbumbi and defeated it, with Imbangala allies eating the Duke and other Kongo nobles. However, Pedro II brought down a larger army, defeated the Portuguese force and began a campaign of humiliation for the many Portuguese resident in Kongo. In the aftermath of this shock, many Portuguese resident in Luanda, who had invested money in Kongo were threatened with ruin and demanded the governor leave. Correia de Sousa was driven from Ndongo and was imprisoned in Portugal. Kongo, meanwhile, had also made an alliance with the Dutch West India Company to attack Luanda, and the junta that ran Angola in the aftermath of Correia de Sousa's expulsion, quickly made peace with Kongo, restoring some of the slaves they had seized. As a result, Kongo refused to assist Piet Heyn's fleet from the Netherlands when it arrived and attacked Luanda in 1624.

Following the disaster of Correia de Sousa, the crown sent Fernão de Sousa to be governor of Angola in 1624. He had orders to make fewer unjust wars in the country, and he tried to bring some order to its fiscal system. But he insisted on keeping Portuguese positions at Ambaca and to return the captured kijiko in Ndongo, and was reluctant to recognize Njinga as ruler of Ndongo following the death of her brother by suicide in 1624. As a result of the failure of negotiations, de Sousa undertook a series of wars against Njinga. Two major wars in 1626 and 1628 drove Njinga from the Kingdonga Island to Matamba where she established her base in 1631. Fitful negotiations followed, and in 1639 Njinga concluded a peace with Portugal. At the same time Portugal established diplomatic relations with Kasanje, the Imbangala band that occupied the Kwango River valley south of Njinga's domains in Matamba.

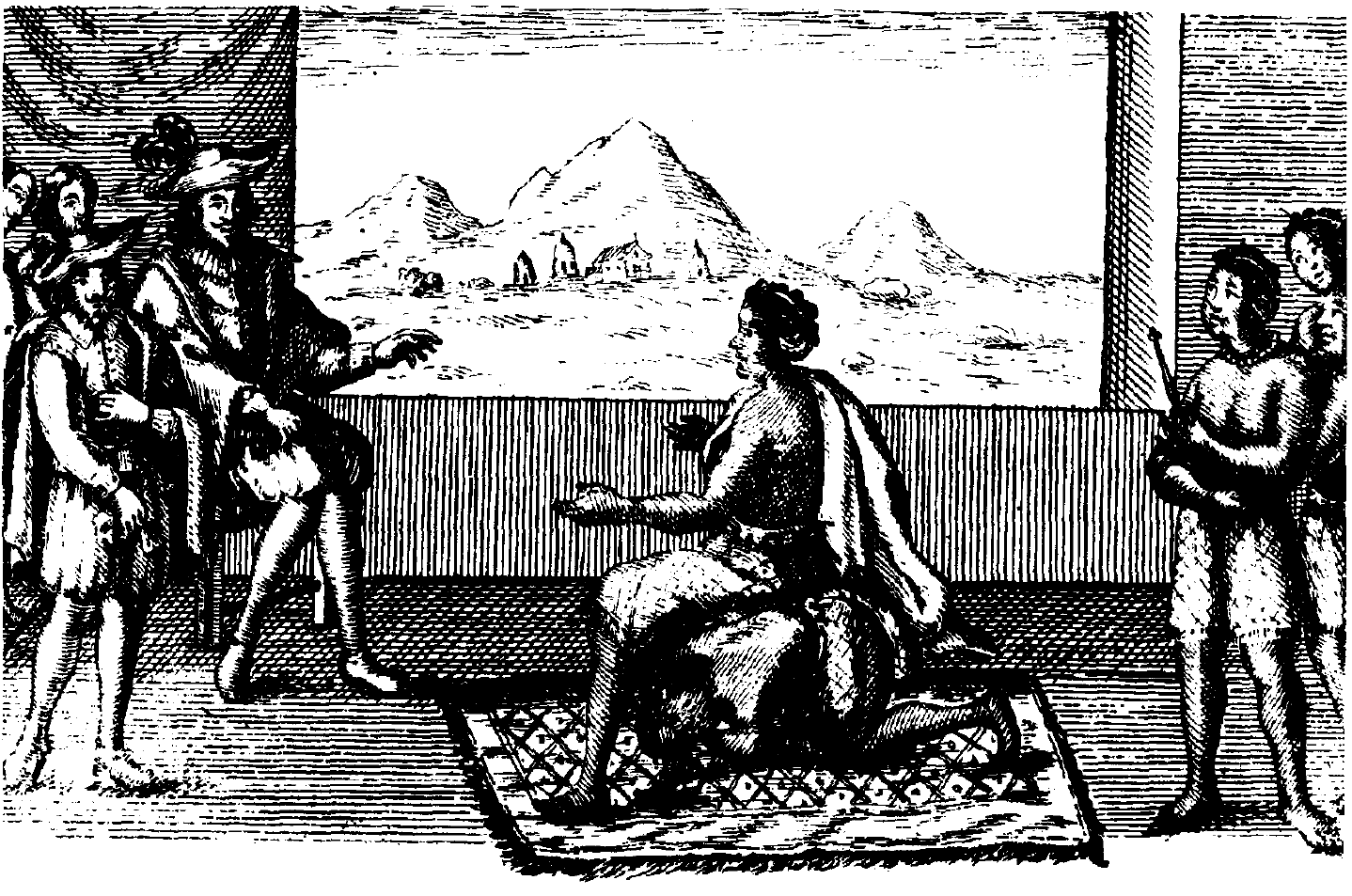
Queen Nzinga in peace negotiations with the Portuguese governor in Luanda, 1657.

Salvador de Sá sought to restore Portuguese authority as much as possible during his rule from 1648 to 1652. However, he made little progress, aside from forcing Njinga to retreat from her position in Cavanga to Matamba. His successors in the seventeenth century sought to renew the warfare that had expanded Portuguese authority and filled slaves ships before the Dutch interlude. However aggressive foreign policies were less successful. Following a disastrous campaign in Kisama in 1654-55 the governor was faced with widespread settler disobedience as they saw that the wars hurt their trade and killed their subjects.
