= Kingdom of Benguela =

Historical Ovimbundu African state

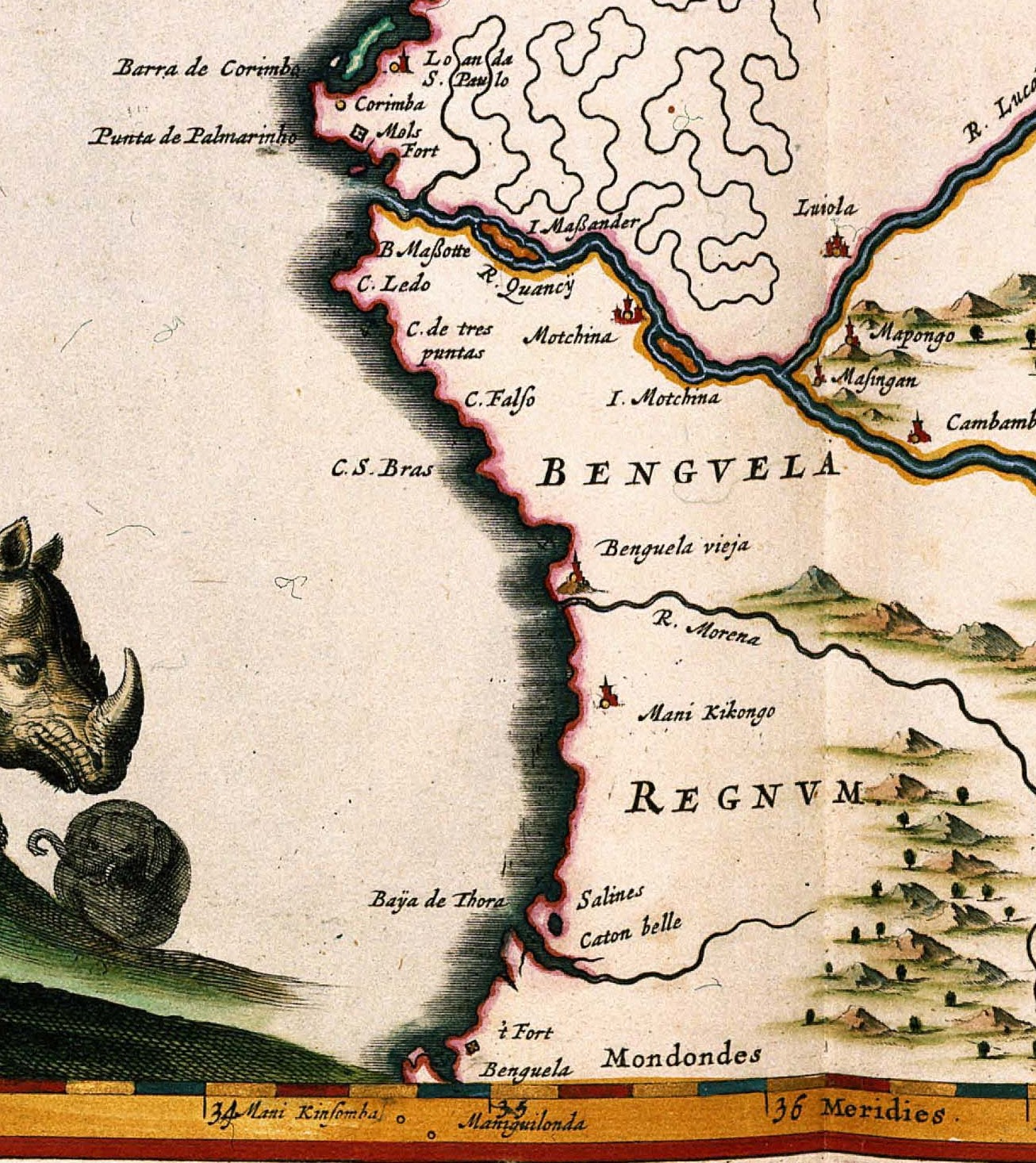
The Kingdom of Benguela marked in a Dutch map, circa 1662.

The Kingdom of Benguela was a historical Ovimbundu African state that once existed in what is now Angola, before it dissolved in the mid 17th century. It was also the name given later to a unit of the Portuguese Empire, but it was unrelated to the old native kingdom of Benguela. In 1869, Portuguese Benguela was merged with Portuguese Angola.

== History ==
The Kingdom of Benguela was the earliest highland society from the Central Highlands of Angola to be recorded in written documents. It was known as a source of copper by the Portuguese, who sent a commercial mission to the kingdom as early as 1546.

Benguela was one of the capital enemies of the Kingdom of Ndongo. The king of Ndongo defeated Benguela in battle in 1563, killed its king and partitioned the kingdom between two of his sons, who were henceforth required to pay tribute, but they revolted soon afterwards and another war ensued. Benguela eventually recovered its independence and unity.

The Portuguese explorer Paulo Dias de Novais established the city of Luanda in 1576 but war broke out with the neighbouring kingdom of Ndongo just three years later. After the Portuguese were victorious against Ndongo at the battle of Casicola in 1586, the king of Benguela contacted Novais and offered to become a vassal of Portugal. A Portuguese diplomatic mission to Beguela the following year was blocked by the chiefs of Quissama, however.

By the end of the 16th century, Benguela was a relatively large kingdom, covering the northwestern part of the Bié Plateau between the headwaters of the Cuvo River and the Longa River. In about 1600, its ruler was Hombi a Njimbe, transliterated as Hombiangymbe by the English traveller Andrew Battel, who visited the region about that time. Hombi a Njimbe was said to rule over 100 tribal chiefs.

The Kingdom of Benguela would meet its demise at the hands of invading Imbangala marauders. The Imbangala lived from plunder but their origins are ultimately unknown. One theory states that they may have originated in the Central Highlands as armies in the wars between Benguela and its neighbours. The king of Benguela had requested military aid from Portugal against the marauding Imbangala as early as 1590. One of their number was Imbe Kalandula, the leader of a war-band who crossed over the Cuvo river into Benguela and remained in the region for five months, fighting against the forces of Benguela and raiding the surrounding countryside for crops and people to take as slaves or to consume in cannibalistic rituals.

The Portuguese interim governor of Angola Bento Banha Cardoso was succeeded in the Autumn of 1615 by Manuel Cerveira Pereira, who had persuaded king Phillip III to establish a new colony in Benguela. Eighteen months after landing in Luanda, he headed south. Cerveira Pereira reached the region of Benguela but found that the kingdom had been wiped out by the Imbangala, and the area was so depopulated and devoid of economic activity that he proceeded further south with his expedition. By that point, the land south of the Cuanza had been "demolished and destroyed by Imbangala activity".

== See also ==
- Angolan Wars
- History of Angola
- Portuguese Angola
- Fort São Filipe de Benguela
