= Mukambu of Matamba =

Queen regnant of Ndongo and Matamba (1663– 1666)

Mukambu Mbandi (also called Kambu, Barbara) (died 1666) was the queen regnant of the Kingdom of Ndongo and Matamba from 1663 to 1666.

== Life ==
Mukambu Mbandi was the younger sister of the famous queen Nzinga, who united the kingdoms of Ndongo and Matamba. During Nzinga's wars against the Portuguese, Mukambu was captured on two occasions. First, in 1629, while Nzigna attempted to escape from enemy forces, Mukambu and her sister Funji were captured when the Portuguese caught up to and destroyed their camp. They were brought to Luanda and paraded naked before the governor there. Mukambu was released by the Portuguese several years later, but she and her attendants were recaptured in 1646 when Nzinga's forces were defeated in the Battle of Kavanga. She was sexually abused by a Mbundu soldier in the Portuguese forces before she was placed under a Portuguese guard.

After years of negotiations between Nzinga and the Portuguese, Mukambu was finally released in 1656. In exchange, Nzinga agreed to convert her realm to Catholicism, and she provided the Portuguese with a ransom of 130 slaves, plus additional slaves given as gifts to Portuguese officials in the course of the negotiations.

Her sister then appointed Mukambu as her designated heir and successor. Nzinga attempted to arrange for her to marry her general and kinsman João Guterres Ngola Kanini, but he already had a Christian wife, so Mukambu instead married the Imbangala general Njinga a Mona. After the death of Nzinga at the end of 1663, Mukambu succeeded her on the throne. Following Mukambu's own death in 1666, a period of instability and civil warfare followed in Matamba, as a faction under Njinga a Mona contended against the supporters of João Guterres and his children.

Regnal titles
Preceded by Ana I	Queen of Ndongo and Matamba; 1663–1666	Succeeded by Njinga a Mona
