= Colonial history of Angola =

The colonial history of Angola is usually considered to run from the appearance of the Portuguese under Diogo Cão in 1482 (Congo) or 1484 (Angolan coast) until the independence of Angola in November 1975. Settlement did not begin until Novais's establishment of São Paulo de Loanda (Luanda) in 1575, however, and the Portuguese government only formally incorporated Angola as a colony in 1655 or on May 12, 1886.

== 16th century ==
Luanda was founded in 1576 with a hundred families of settlers and 400 soldiers. Benguela was founded as a fort in 1587.

== 17th century ==
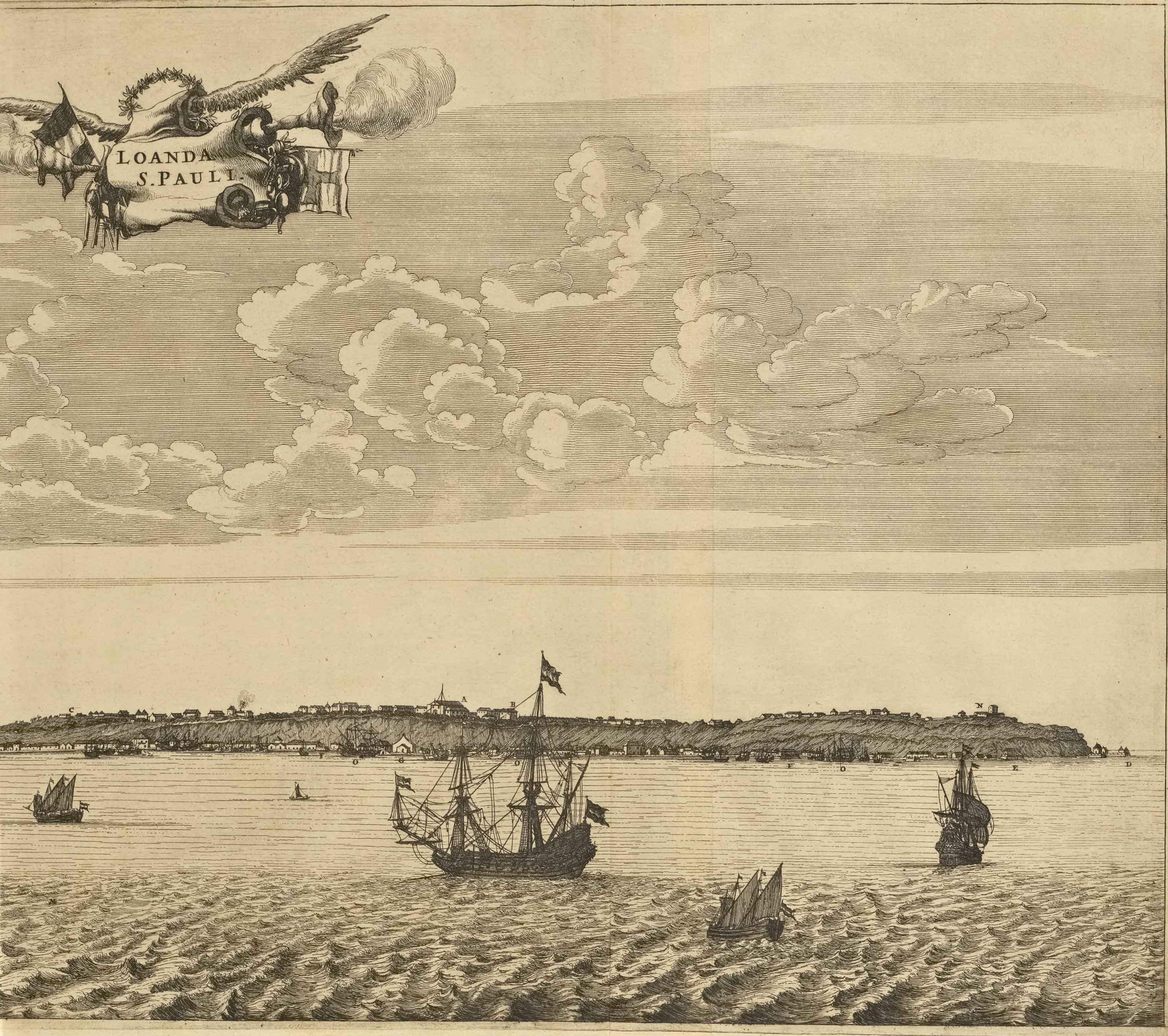
A view of Dutch warships off the port city of Luanda from the Description of Africa, published in 1668

Luanda was granted the status of city in 1605. In 1617, Benguela developed into a town. In 1618 the Portuguese built Fortaleza São Pedro da Barra fortress, followed by the Fortaleza de São Miguel fortress in 1634. Luanda was Portuguese Angola's administrative centre from 1627, with one exception.

During the Portuguese war of independence against the Spanish, the Dutch ruled Luanda from 1640 to 1648 as Fort Aardenburgh. The Portuguese sought to reassert their control over Angola after the Dutch occupation of the 1640s. Angola was a part of Portuguese West Africa from the annexation of several territories in the region as a colony in 1655 until its designation as an overseas province, effective October 20, 1951.

Brazil's influence in Angola grew substantially after 1650, with some observers comparing Angola's relationship with Brazil as a colony to its empire. Contact with Brazil resulted in the transfer of cassava from South America to Angola and the transformation of Angolan agriculture, increasing the diversity of the local diet and reducing the impact of drought on farmers' harvest.

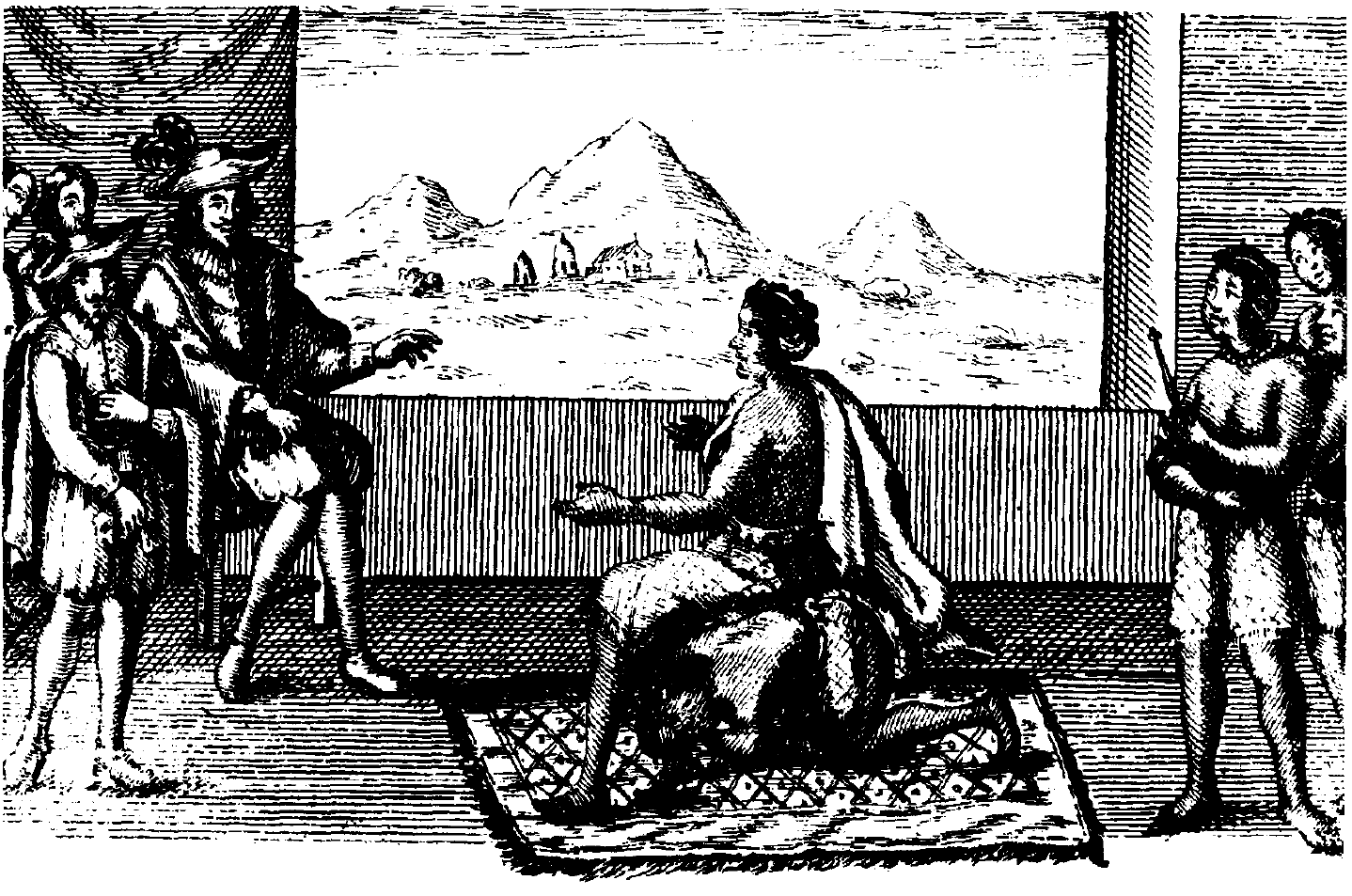
Contemporary illustration of Queen Nzinga in negotiations with the Portuguese governor, dated 1657

In 1656, the Portuguese signed a treaty with Queen Nzinga of Ndongo, an adversary of the Portuguese who had been expelled from Kingdom in the 1620s by the Imbangala.

The Portuguese went to war with the Kingdom of the Kongo in 1660. António I succeeded his father, Garcia II, as the King of the Kongo in 1661. António led the Kongo against the Portuguese until his disastrous loss at the Battle of Mbwila on 29 October 1665. the Portuguese suffered a disastrous defeat at the Battle of Kitombo when they tried to invade Kongo in 1670. António died at Mbwila and the Portuguese abolished his army. Kongo suffered from division and decline after António's death.

Their principal ally in the war against Queen Nzinga, defected when Portugal agreed to accept her claim as Queen of Ndongo in 1657. She revolted in 1670. Although the Portuguese managed to defeat her in a long siege of the capital, Mpungo Andongo, in 1671, it was a costly victory. Further interference in Matamba and the affairs of Matamba and Kasanje in 1680s led to another defeat at the Battle of Katole in 1684. Following this affair, Portugal turned its attention away from war in the north either against Kongo or Ndongo.

In 1684, the bishop's seat was moved to São Paulo de Luanda, and São Salvador declined in importance, especially after its abandonment in 1678 as the civil war in that country intensified. Even after Pedro IV restored the city and repopulated it in 1709, the ecclesiastical center of gravity in Angola rested with the Portuguese colony.

== Colony of Benguela ==
The attention of the Portuguese was, moreover, now turned more particularly to the southern districts of Angola. The colony of Benguela had been founded by Governor Manuel Cerveira Pereira in 1617. Initially, he had hoped to make it an aggressive military colony like Angola, but after an unsuccessful alliance with the local Imbangala, had had to abandon these plans. His plans to further strengthen the colony by seizing rich copper mines reputed to be in Sumbe also came to naught. Other attempts to expand from Benguela, such as the lengthy campaign of Lopo Soares Lasso in 1629 failed to produce many slaves or conquests.

In the 1680s, following the failure of northern warfare, Portuguese governors tried again to make more war in the south. They embroiled themselves in the politics of the Ovimbundu Kingdoms that lay in the central highlands (Bihe Plateau) of Angola. These campaigns, especially ambitious ones in the 1770s, resulted in formal agreements of vassalage between some of the more important of the kingdoms, such as Viye and Mbailundu, but were never either large sources of slaves or real conquests from which resources or tribute could be drawn.

== 18th century ==
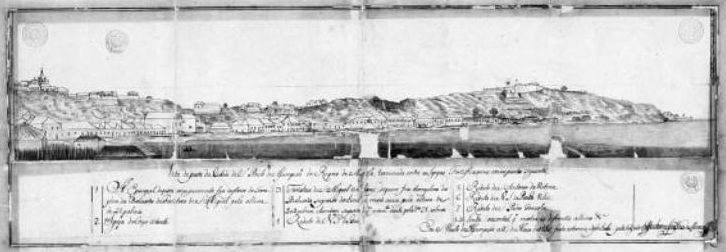
Illustration of Angola in 1755

In the 18th century, Portuguese governors sought to limit what they considered illegal trade by merchants in their colony with rival European merchants who frequently visited the northern kingdoms of Kongo and Loango. To this end, they established a fort and settlement at Encoje (near Mbwila) to block travel through the mountainous gap that allowed merchants to cross to Kongo. In 1783–1784 they sought to occupy Cabinda on the north coast, but were driven away, and from 1789 to 1792 the Portuguese colonial government initiated a war against the Marquisate of Mussolo (the district immediately south of Ambriz in Kongo's territory) without much success. In 1791 they built a fort at Quincolo on the Loje, and worked the mines of Bembe.

At the same time, Portugal also sought to extend its relations into the interior, especially the lands beyond the Kwango River. Matamba and Kasanje had consistently blocked attempts by Portuguese merchants to penetrate into their lands, and in 1755–1756, Manuel Correia Leitão, visited Kasanje and reported on the lands across the Kwanza. Among them was the powerful Lunda Empire whose armies had conquered much of the territory there. Lunda eventually entered into diplomatic relations with Portugal, sending an embassy there in the early nineteenth century and receiving counter embassies from Luanda.

The Portuguese from Benguela sought increasingly to expand their power and gain resource wealth in the Bihe Plateau during the eighteenth century, and following their intervention in the Mbailundu War in the 1770s had treaty relationships (which they described as vassalage) with the various states there. These arrangements included gathering Portuguese merchants in capital cities and making permanent presences in the capitals of these states. From these bases, Portugal sought to explore trade relations with Lunda that avoided the Kwango River states.

== 19th century ==
Portuguese possessed no fort or settlement on the coast to the north of Ambriz, which had been first occupied in 1855, until the "scramble for Africa" in 1884. Portuguese forces intervened in a civil war between 1855 and 1856, helping Pedro V Água Rosada come to the throne of Kongo. They left a fort at São Salvador, which they maintained until 1866. Pedro V reigned over thirty years. In 1888 a Portuguese resident was stationed at Salvador, when Pedro agreed to become a Portuguese vassal. He hoped to use the Portuguese to assist in his attempt to rebuild royal authority in other parts of Kongo.

Full Portuguese administrative control of the interior did not occur until the beginning of the 20th century, when resistance from a number of population groups was overcome. Chief among these was the uprising of the Kwanyama, led by their leader Mandume Ya Ndemufayo.

In 1884 Britain, which up to that time had steadily refused to acknowledge that Portugal possessed territorial rights north of Ambriz, concluded a treaty recognizing Portuguese sovereignty over both banks of the lower Congo, but the treaty, meeting with opposition in Britain and Germany, was not ratified. Agreements concluded with the Congo Free State, Germany and France in 1885–1886 (modified in details by subsequent arrangements) fixed the limits of the province, except in the south-east, where the frontier between Barotseland (Northern Rhodesia) and Angola was determined by an Anglo-Portuguese agreement of 1891 and the arbitration award of the king of Italy in 1905.

Up to the end of the 19th century the hold of Portugal over the interior of the province was slight, though its influence extended to the Congo and Zambezi basins. The abolition of the external slave trade proved very injurious to the trade of the seaports. From 1860 onward, the agricultural resources of the country were developed with increasing energy, a work in which Brazilian merchants took the lead. After the definite partition of Africa among the European powers, Portugal applied herself with some seriousness to exploit Angola and her other African possessions. Nevertheless, in comparison with its natural wealth, the development of the country had been slow.

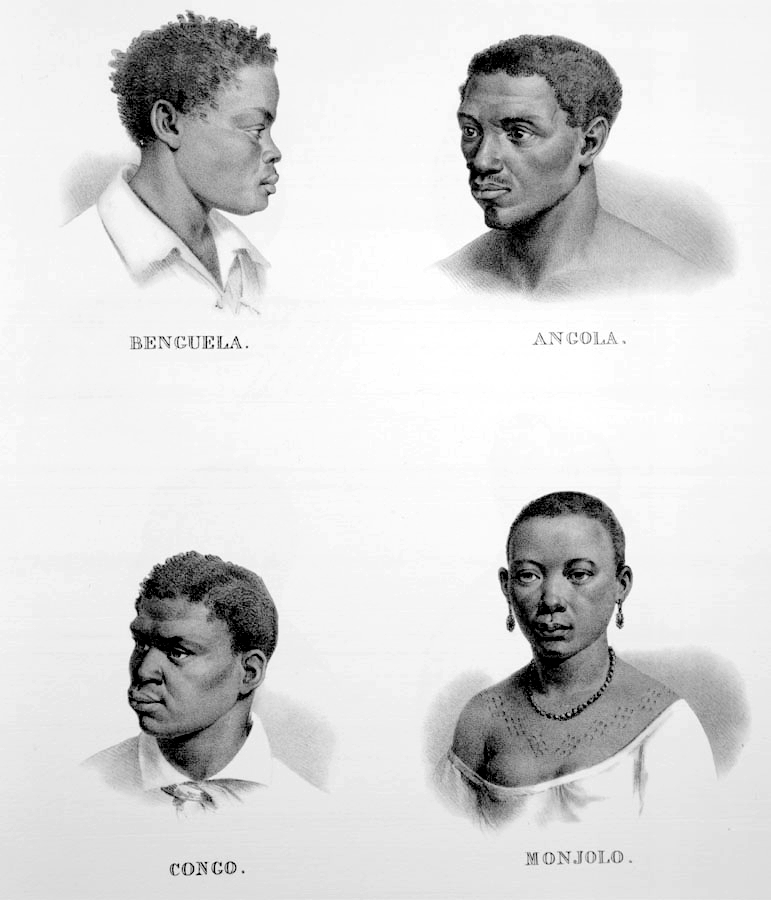
Slaves from Benguela, Angola, Kongo and Monjolo. Illustration published from 1835.

Slavery and the slave trade continued to flourish in the interior in the early years of the 20th century, despite the prohibitions of the Portuguese government. The extension of authority over the inland tribes proceeded very slowly and was not accomplished without occasional reverses. In September 1904 a Portuguese column lost over 300 men, including 114 Europeans, in the Battle of the Cunene, an encounter with the Kunahamas on the Kunene River, not far from the German frontier. The Kunahamas were probably largely influenced by the revolt of their southern neighbours, the Hereros, against the Germans. In 1905 and again in 1907, there was renewed fighting in the same region.

Until the early 19th century, Portugal's primary interest in Angola was slavery. The slaving system began early in the 16th century with the purchase from African chiefs of people to work on sugar plantations in São Tomé, Príncipe, and Brazil. The Imbangala and the Mbundu tribes, active slave hunters, were for centuries the main providers of slaves to the market of Luanda. Those slaves were bought by Brazilian traders and shipped to America, including the Portuguese colony of Brazil.

Whilst the economic development of the country was not entirely neglected and many useful food products were introduced, the prosperity of the province was very largely dependent on the slave trade with the Portuguese colony of Brazil, which was not legally abolished until 1830 after Brazil's independence from Portugal (1822) and in fact continued for many years subsequently. Many scholars agree that by the 19th century, Angola was the largest source of slaves not only for Brazil, but for the Americas, including the United States. By the end of the 19th century, a massive forced labour system had replaced slavery and would continue until outlawed in 1961. Portuguese colonial rule in the twentieth century was characterized by rigid dictatorship and exploitation of African labor.

It was this forced labor that provided the basis for development of a plantation economy and, by the mid-20th century, a major mining sector. Forced labour was employed by the Portuguese to construct three railways from the coast to the interior. The most important of these was the transcontinental Benguela railroad that linked the port of Lobito with the copper zones of the Belgian Congo and what is now Zambia.

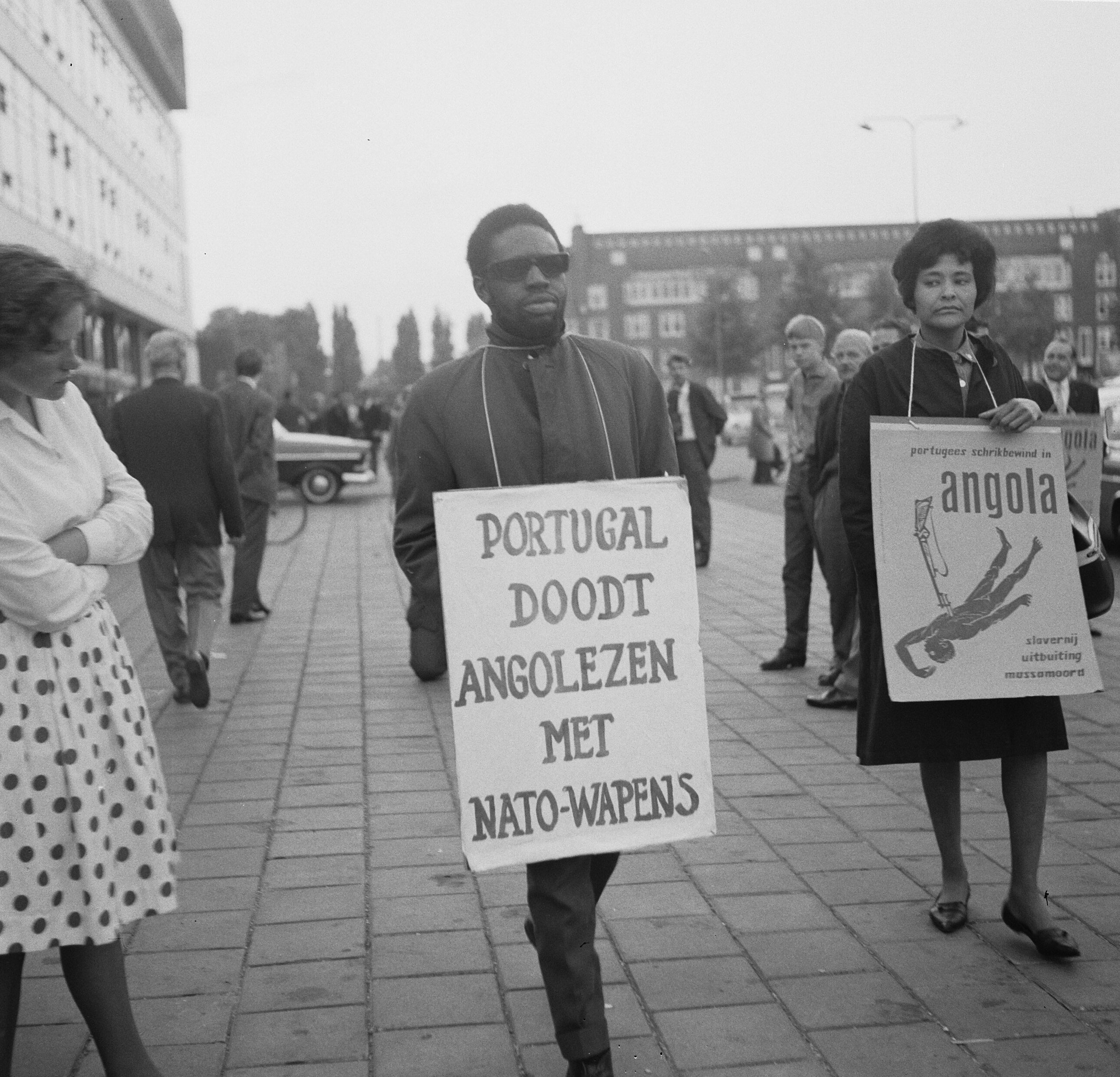
1960s demonstration against Portuguese rule in Angola

The strong colonial economic development did not transform into social development for a large majority of native Angolans. The Portuguese regime encouraged white immigration, especially after 1950, which intensified racial antagonism; many new Portuguese settlers arrived after World War II.

=== Congo and Cabinda ===
Portuguese Congo (Cabinda) was established a Portuguese protectorate by the 1885 Treaty of Simulambuco. Sometime during the 1920s, it became incorporated into the larger colony (later the overseas province) of Portuguese Angola. The two colonies had initially been contiguous, but later became geographically separated by a narrow corridor of land, which Portugal ceded to Belgium allowing Belgian Congo access to the Atlantic Ocean. Following the decolonisation of Portuguese Angola with the 1975 Alvor Agreement, the short-lived Republic of Cabinda unilaterally declared its independence. However, Cabinda was soon overpowered and re-annexed by the newly proclaimed People's Republic of Angola and never achieved international recognition.

== See also ==
- Precolonial history of Angola
- History of Angola
- Slavery in Angola
- 1940s in Angola
- 1950s in Angola
