= Kasanje Kingdom =

State in present-day Angola (1620–1912)

Kingdom of Kasanje
- 1620–1912
- Government: Elective monarchy
- Kinguri
  - c. 1620: Kalanda ka Imbe
  - 1911-1912: Ngwangwa
- Historical era: Early Modern, Late Modern
  - Established: 1620
  - Incorporation into Portuguese Angola: 1912

Population
  - 1680: ~300,000
| Preceded by | Succeeded by |
| Imbangala | Portuguese Angola |
- Today part of: Lunda Norte Province
- 1. Population estimate is possibly exaggerated.

The Kasanje Kingdom (1620–1910), also known as the Jaga Kingdom, was a Central African state. It was formed in 1620 by a mercenary band of Imbangala, which had deserted the Portuguese ranks. The state gets its name from the leader of the band, Kasanje, who settled his followers on the upper Kwango River. The Kasanje people were ruled by the kinguri, a king who was elected from among the three clans who founded the kingdom.

== History ==
In the 1650s the intellectuals of Kasanje developed a largely fiction history that sought to give meaning and stability to the state. This history claimed a Zimbo and Tendo Andumba, and their daughter Tendo Anduma as the founding force of the nation.

By the 1650s Kasanje had been making war with many of its neighbours for quite some time. These included Queen Nzinga of Ndongo and Matamba, and also areas called Lubolo, Beebe, Haku, and Sango.

Kasanje also had relations with the Yaka Kingdom of the Yaka people. Nbangu a Kutana kwa Mbuku, whose father was the King of Yaka, was for a time a prisoner in Kasanje but later was freed and established more peaceful relations between the states.

In the 1650s Kasanje had six major languages as a result of recent conquests. The conquests continued in this decade with significant taking of areas in Bembe in 1657.

On the south Kasanje bordered a domain called Muzumbu a Kalungu which controlled an area between the Kwanza River and the headwaters of the Cunene River. It appears that Kasanje captured some of the territory of Muzumbu a Kalungu.

There were many Portuguese merchants who operated in Kasanje by the 1650s.

In 1680, the Portuguese traveller António de Oliveira de Cadornega estimated the kingdom had 300,000 people, of whom 100,000 were able to bear arms. However, it is noted that this claim may be exaggerated. The kingdom of Kasanje remained in a constant state of conflict with its neighbours, especially the kingdom of Matamba, then ruled by queen Nzinga Mbande. The Imbangala state became a strong commercial centre until being eclipsed by Ovimbundu trade routes in the 1850s. The decreased importance of the slave trade caused the position of the kinguri (king) to grow weak. Kasanje was finally incorporated into Portuguese Angola in 1910–1911.

== List of kings of Kasanje ==
The kings of Kasanje (kinguri) are listed below based on a compilation of several different contemporary king lists by Joseph C. Miller.

Kings of Kasanje (WIP)
| King name | Dates | Notes |
|---|---|---|
| Zimbo | c. 1500s? | Existence disputed |
| Donji | | Husband of Mussasa |
| Mussasa | | Mother of Tembandumba |
| Tembandumba | c. 1500s? | Existence disputed |
| Kulembe | 1560s? | |
| Kinguri | 1560s? | |
| Kalanda ka Imbe | c. 1600s | Met by the English traveller Andrew Battel, 1601–1603 |
Kasanje Kingdom founded c. 1620
| Kasanje ka Kulashingo | c. 1616–1622 | Captured and executed by the Portuguese |
| Kalunga ka Kilombo | 1622-1655 | Killed by his adopted son. |
| Pascoal Machado | 1655-1679 | Formerly "Ngonga a Mbande". Killed in an attack from Matamba and Mbundu armies |
| Kingwangwa kya Kima | c. 1680–1681 | Usurper; possibly identified as "Luiz Dala" |
| Kitamba kya Keta | 1681-1690? | Possibly identified as "Luiz Dala" |
| Mwanya a Kasanje | c. 1690s? | |
| Kiluanje kya Ngonga | c. 1690s-1700s? | |
| Kinguri kya Kasombe | c. 1700s? | |
| Kitumba kya Kalunga | c. 1710s | |
| Kambamba ka Kinguri | c. 1720s? | |
| Kasanje ka Kiluanje | c. 1730s? | |
| Lubame lwa Kipungo | c. 1739-1750s? | |
| Ngunza a Kambamba | c. 1750–1770 | Extremely powerful |
| Lukala lwa Njinje | Early 1770s? | |
| Kalunga ka Luhame | Mid 1770s? | |
| Kitumba kya Wanga | Late 1770s-Early 1780s? | |
| Kisweya kya Kambamba | Mid 1780s? | |
| Kitamba kya Shiba | c. 1785–1792 | |
| Malenge a Ngonga | 1792-c. 1810 | Defeated by Félix Velazco Galiano, commander of Pungo Andongo, in 1805 |
| Kitumba kya Ngonga | c. 1810–1820 | |
| Kansanje kya Kambolo | c. 1820s | |
| Kihengo kya Kambolo | Early 1830s | |
| Kamasa ka Kiwende | Mid 1830s | |
| Mbumba a Kinguri | c. 1840–1850 | Expelled by a Portuguese expeditionary force in 1850 |
| Kalunga ka Kisanga | 1850 | Ruled as a Portuguese vassal; assassinated in late 1850 by Mbumba a Kinguri loyalists |
| Kambolo ka Ngonga | 1851-1856 | Known as "Dom Fernando Accacio Ferreira" to the Portuguese |
| Kamweje ka Kalunga | 1856-1857 | Died under mysterious circumstances |
| Mbumba a Kinguri | 1857-1873 | 2nd reign, probably arranged Kamweje ka Kalunga's death. Kingdom embroiled in civil war after his death |
Civil War, 1873-1883
| Malenge a Kitumba | 1873 | Killed in battle |
| Kwango | 1883-1885 | Swore fealty to Luis I of Portugal |
| Kasanje ka Kalanyi | 1888 | Had little authority, upon death a political stalemate lasted until 1896 |
| Kinguri kya Kiluanje | 1896 | Also known as Mushabata; immediately expelled and another stalemate occurred until 1911 |
| Ngwangwa | 1911-1912 | Defeated both warring factions; led a failed revolt against the Portuguese in 1912 that led to the end of the kingdom |

== Location ==
Kasanje is located on the upper Kwango River in what is now Angola.

== See also ==
- Angolan Wars
- Portuguese Angola
- Campaigns of Pacification and Occupation
