= Libolo =

- Municipality
- Location in Angola
- Coordinates: 10°2′S 14°38′E
- Country: Angola
- Province: Cuanza Sul Province

Area
  - Total: 2,280 sq mi (5,910 km^{2})

Population (2014 Census)
  - Total: 92,069
  - Density: 40.3/sq mi (15.6/km^{2})
- Time zone: UTC+1 (WAT)
- Website: https://www.kalulo.com

Libolo is a municipality in Cuanza Sul Province in Angola, with the town of Calulo as the municipal seat. The municipality is home to the notable Angolan sports club Recreativo do Libolo.

== See also ==
- Kingdom of Libolo
