= Ana II of Matamba =

Queen regnant of the Kingdom of Ndongo and Matamba

Ana II Guterres da Silva Ngola Kanini

Queen of Ndongo and Matamba
- Reign: 1742–1756
- Predecessor: Afonso I Guterres
- Successor: Verónica II of Matamba
- Died: 1756

Ana II Guterres da Silva Ngola Kanini (died 1756) was the queen regnant of the Kingdom of Ndongo and Matamba from 1742 to 1756.

Ana II has been referred to as the daughter of queen Verónica I Guterres, but was in fact her granddaughter. Because there is an interregnum between the year Afonso I is said to have ended his reign in 1741, and the year in which Ana II is said to have succeeded in 1742, there is a theory that she was preceded by her sister queen Juliana I Guterres, and that she adopted Juliana's daughter Verónica, her niece, as her heir and crown princess. This is not confirmed, but Verónica was referred to as her daughter and was named her designated heir to the throne.

Ana II faced a Portuguese invasion in 1744. The invasion of Matamba by Portuguese forces in 1744 was one of their largest military operations in the eighteenth century. In the course of their attack, Matamba's army inflicted a serious defeat on the Portuguese, but in spite of this, a remnant of the army managed to reach the capital of Matamba.

Ana II fled the capital while the invasion was happening but remained in its general vicinity. In order to avoid a long war and to get them to withdraw, Ana II signed a treaty of vassalage with Portugal. Her motivation for doing do seems to have been to convince the remaining Portuguese soldiers to leave her domains. The treaty largely renewed points conceded by Verónica in 1683 and was essentially that treaty repeated. While the treaty allowed Portugal to claim Matamba as a vassal, and opened up Matamba to Portuguese trade, it had little effect on the real sovereignty of Matmaba, or indeed in the conduct of trade.

Ana II, like Verónica before her, was interested in developing Matamba as a Christian country, routinely sending letters to the Capuchin prefect of Congo and Angola or the Portuguese authorities requesting missionaries come and establish permanent bases in her country. While the country was visited by missionaries from Cahenda and also from the Barefoot Carmelites, a permanent mission was not established.

She died in 1756 and was succeeded by her heir, Verónica II, who was two years later deposed and killed by her daughter, Ana III.

Issue

- Verónica II Guterres (d. 1758), may have been niece and adoptive daughter
- Ana III Guterres (d. 1767)

Ana II of Matamba House of Guterres
Regnal titles
Preceded by Afonso I Guterres	Queen of Ndongo and Matamba; 1742–1756	Succeeded by Verónica II
