= Jinga =

Jinga may refer to:

- Nzinga of Ndongo and Matamba
- Kamana, Queen of Jinga
- Ion Jinga
- Kami no Kiba: Jinga
