= Kafushe Kambare =

Title of a historical line of rulers

Kafushe Kambare, also spelled Kafuxi ka Mbari (Soba Cafuxe in Portuguese) was the title of a historical line of rulers in what is now Angola. The chiefdom of the Kafushe was the most powerful of several in the marshy Quiçama region. They distinguished themselves for having once inflicted a major defeat on the Portuguese during the Angolan Wars, which lingered long in popular local memory.

The Kafushe Kambare were originally vassals of the king of Ndongo, like the rest of the chiefs of Quissama. Their territory lied in the southern part of Quissama, bordered the Atlantic on one side, and the chiefdoms of Malumba a Kambolo and Longa ria Ndongo on the other. The origins of the Kafushe is unclear, and the Portuguese once camped a detachment of troops on his territory to support him against a rival lord at least as early as 1588. This seems to have been the only time in which a Kafushe Kambare joined the Portuguese in a common cause.

The terrain in Quissama.

Relations with Luanda must have ruptured shortly afterwards however, as after the salt mines of Quissama were seized by the Portuguese, all the local sobas submitted to them, except the Kafushe. A force of 130 Portuguese soldiers and some cavalrymen supported by an auxiliary force of several allied sobas marched against Kafushe, but although the cavalry succeeded in disorganizing the forces of the Kafushe in a first attack, he fell back to wooded and broken ground. The Portuguese were lured onto uneven ground, surrounded and routed, having suffered severe casualties, including two leading sobas. The Kafushe did not follow up on his victory and the survivors fell back to the Cuanza.

This was the first major setback suffered by the Portuguese in Angola. The Kafushe gained great prestige as a result of his victory and some sobas wished to elect him king in replacement of the ruler of Ndongo, Mbandi Ngola, who thus came to fear him. The rebellion of some Quissama lords along the Cuanza river, followed by the siege of Massangano in 1595 led the Portuguese to establish a new fort at Muxima, on the south bank of the Cuanza, in Quissama territory.

Early in the 17th century, Quissama was invaded by a marauding Imbangala band led by Imbe Kalandula. Kalandula was an ally of soba Langere, a neighbour of the Kafushe. He crossed over the Cuvo river north into Quissama with the aid of the Portuguese. A conflict with Kafushe ensued but it ended inconclusively. Although the Kafushe had to withstand several more invasions of their territory, the Portuguese veteran and chronicler António de Oliveira Cadornega still considered them to be the leading Quissama lord, as although they had once been vassals of Ndongo, they came to hold the prestige of kings themselves, rule over large territories and collected tribute from surrounding lords.

In the early 17th century Governor João Rodrigues Coutinho assembled the "biggest force ever gathered" by Portuguese in Angola up to that point with the aid of the Kingdom of Kongo, in preparation to annex the region of Cambambe from the Kingdom of Ndongo, but he died prematurely. Nevertheless, captain Cerveira Pereira defeated the lords Axila Mbanza and Kafushe Kambare. Governor Manuel Cerveira Pereira negotiated a military access agreement with the Kafushe and thus opened a route to Cambambe, where a new fort was built in 1604. Whether it was after defeating him in battle or by accord, however, is unclear. Nevertheless, the chiefdom of the Kafushe as well as most of the Quissama would remain unsubmitted territory for long afterwards.

The Portuguese avoided the highly malarial Quiassama swamplands and the Kafushe Kambare chiefdom lingered into the 20th century, but by that point it was in decadence due to epidemics, which reduced the local population from an estimated 40,000 people to only 10,000 by 1930.

== See also ==
- Kingdom of Ndongo
- Angolan Wars
- Quiçama National Park
