= Zimbo =

Zimbo may refer to:

== Arts and entertainment ==
- TV Zimbo, a television network in Angola
- Zimbo (film), a 1958 Bollywood film
- Zimbo Trio, a Brazilian instrumental ensemble established in 1964 in São Paulo
- a character in the Aaahh!!! Real Monsters cartoon series
- "All My Colours", also known as "Zimbo", a song by Echo & the Bunnymen from the 1981 album Heaven Up Here and the 2018 album The Stars, the Oceans & the Moon

== Other uses ==
- Zimbo (Ruler of the Jagas), the predecessor of Mussasa in what is now Angola
- "Zimbo", a demonym for a person from Zimbabwe
- Zimbo, a term proposed by the philosopher Daniel Dennett, meaning a philosophical zombie which can interrogate and discuss its own internal states
- ZIMBO, a brand name of Bell Food Group
- Zimbo, a form of shell currency once used in the Congo
