= Imbe Kalandula =

Imbe Kalandula (fl. late 16th century - early 17th century) also spelled Kalanda ka Imbe, was an Imbangala leader, made known chiefly by the writings of the English traveler Andrew Battel.

== Life ==
His band was the best-known one south of the Cuanza River, and by 1600 he was camped with his followers at the mouth of the Cuvo River. Imbe Kalandulas wanderings seem to have taken a more southerly course than the war-band of Kasanje. While camped at the mouth of the Cuvo, the band of Kalandula was visited by a party of European merchants, among whom was the Englishman Andrew Battel, who had been captured by the Portuguese and brought to Angola as a prisoner. He was taken as part of one of four voyages organized by Portuguese merchants, who helped Imbe Kalandula cross the Cuvo to attack the Kingdom of Benguela.

Battel remained among the Imbangala for sixteen months between 1599 and 1600. On eventually returning to England, Battel famously published an account of his travels, including a description of the Imbangala lifestyle, gathered during his stay with Kalandula. He wrote of Imbe Kalandula that:

There were in the camp of the Gagas twelve captains. The first, called Imbe Calandola, their general, a man of great courage. He warreth all by enchantment, and taketh the Devil’s counsel in all his exploits. He is always making of sacrifices to the Devil, and doth know many times what shall happen unto him. He believeth that he shall never die but in the wars. There is no image among them, but he useth certain ceremonies. He hath straight laws to his soldiers: for, those that are faint-hearted, and turn their backs to the enemy, are presently condemned and killed for cowards, and their bodies eaten. He useth every night to make a warlike oration upon an high scaffold, which doth encourage his people.

— Andrew Battel

Battel did not characterize the Imbangala as an ethnic group but as a company or several independent companies of soldiers who lived entirely off plunder. They "lived a roving life, subsisting by plunder rather than by producing their own food. When they arrived in a new territory, they built a strongly fortified encampment surrounded by a wall of timber and thorns before attacking the local inhabitants. Their most striking feature was their cannibalism. They were not notable hunters, and they did not rear their own herds of cattle, but seem quite genuinely to have eaten human flesh for sustenance and not merely for ritualistic purposes. Their chief luxury was palm wine, which they obtained in such a destructive manner that about every six months they had to move camp and search for new plantations of palm trees. The second remarkable custom of the Imbangala which Battell recorded was their practice of infanticide. They never reared their own children, not even those of the leader. Instead they increased their ranks by recruiting strong adolescents from among the people whom they conquered, and initiating them into the way of life of the Imbangala. To be fully accepted as soldiers, these recruits had to pull out their four middle teeth and present their master with the severed head of an enemy".

Battel estimated the band of Imbe Kalandulas at 16,000 people. It had recruited so many people by capture that only the senior officers were said to be the members of the original band. Yet it was only part of a larger force, whose leader Battel identified as Elembe, the "Great Jaga", and to whom Kalandula was or had been subordinate. The Imbangala destroyed the Kingdom of Benguela, "and perhaps whatever other polities existed in the region" but of which there are no records. When the Portuguese governor of Angola Manuel Cerveira Pereira tried to establish a new colony in the region, he found it so devoid of people or economic activity that he moved further south with his expedition. "By the start of the second decade of the seventeenth century, much of the land south of the Kwanza River (more or less the southern border of Portuguese control) had been demolished and destroyed by Imbangala activity."

After six months spent on the mouth of the Cuvo, Imbe Kalandula migrated with his band towards the northeast and in 1602 he reached the south side of the Cuanza. His aim was probably to make contact with the Portuguese, by then established at Luanda and at war with the Kingdom of Ndongo. Upon arriving however, he found that the Kafushe blocked his path, and so he attacked it. It appears likely from Imbangala oral tradition that Imbe Kalandula met with the Portuguese governor of Angola Manuel Cerveira Pereira in 1603, with whome he allied.

== See also ==
- History of Angola
- Portuguese Angola
- Angolan Wars
- Kingdom of Kasanje
- Kalandula Falls
