= Kalunga of Kasanje =

Ruler of Kasanje (Angola) between 1622-1655

Kasanje Kalunga ka Kinguri was the ruler of the Imbangala kingdom of Kasanje, in modern-day Angola. He succeeded on the throne of Kasanje in 1622 and was later murdered by his adoptive son Ngonga a Mbande, who secured rulership.

== Life ==
The war-band of Kasanje (Cassange in Portuguese) is first known in 1617 when it and several other Imbangala bands migrated from the central highlands of Angola across the Cuanza River. They initially settled in the Kingdom of Ndongo with the consent of its ruler. Afterwards, however, Kasanje served with the Portuguese against Ndongo in 1618 and 1619 but soon defected to engage in independent raiding. Their removal was a key issue in the peace negotiations between Angola and Ndongo in 1622. They were defeated in 1622 by the Portuguese led by captain-major Pedro de Sousa Coelho, who captured and executed the ruling Kasanje, Kulashingo. Kalunga was elected in his place, and the Imbangala migrated away.

Kasanje Kalunga ka Kinguri settled his war-band along the banks of the Cuango River in the 1630s. It moved to Ganguela near the Cuanza in 1635 and signed a peace with Portugal, becoming an important part of Portuguese policy in Angola.

Sometime around this time, Kalunga adopted as his son Ngonga a Mbande, an Ambundu captured during a raid. His bravery, strength, and cruelty made him popular among the Imbangala. He was known to kill animals by tearing their hind legs with his bare hands, and in Imbangala fashion, engaged in human sacrifice and cannibalism. Kalunga was strangled in his old age in 1655 by Ngonga a Mbande, who took the throne and his name, and sacrificed 300 people in his funeral. He would later convert to Catholicism and adopt the name Pascoal Machado.

== See also ==
- Angolan Wars
- History of Angola
