= Verónica I of Matamba =

Matamba queen regnant

Verónica I Guterres
- Born: 17th century
- Died: 1721
- Other names: Kangala Kingwanda
- Occupation: Queen regnant
- Known for: Longest-reigning monarch of the Guterres dynasty; resistance against Portuguese Angola
- Title: Queen of Ndongo and Matamba
- Children: Afonso I of Matamba Afonso I
- Father: João I of Matamba João Guterres Ngola Kanini

Verónica Guterres Kangala Kingwanda (Cangala Quinguanda in contemporary spelling; died 1721) was the ruler of the joint kingdom of Ndongo and Matamba, 1681–1721.

== Background ==
Verónica was daughter to King João Guterres Ngola Kanini of the combined kingdom of Ndongo and Matamba and was an important ruler of the Guterres Dynasty established by Queen Njinga Mbande. She was probably most important in establishing the frequent practice of having female rulers in the country following the turbulent and often challenged reigns of Njinga and her sister Barbara in the period between 1624 and 1666.

No contemporary documentation give any indication of her age. She was probably baptised along with most other Ndongo-Matamba nobles during the period of missionary activity in Matamba following the establishment of the Capuchin mission in 1656. She appears to have always regarded herself as a Christian.

== Reign ==
Verónica came to power following the Portuguese war against Matamba in 1681 in which her predecessor and brother was killed at the Battle of Katole. Although her brother was killed in the action, the forces of Matamba won the battle and the Portuguese withdrew their army. Nevertheless, Queen Verónica decided to treat for peace, signing the agreement with Portugal in 1683. This peace treaty would govern relations between Portugal and Matamba for a long time to come, but was, in fact rarely followed by either participant.

=== Resuming of hostilities ===
In 1689 she attacked the Portuguese in Cahenda in the "Dembos" region to her west, an area that was disputed between Ndongo, Kongo, and Portugal. She was anxious to reestablish Matamba's claims over the Dembos region that lay directly to the east of Matamba, and in 1688–89 her armies moved into the area and threatened Portuguese positions around Ambaca, their fortified town that marked the westernmost edge of the colony of Angola. The Portuguese intervened, and blunted the effectiveness of the campaign.

In around 1701, Luca da Caltanisetta, the prefect of the Capuchin mission in Angola wrote to her asking to re-establish the mission which had fallen vacant, and "to return that people to the granary of the Holy Church." Verónica, whose country had "not fallen entirely back to heathendom" wrote back a pious letter expressing her concern that "it pained her to see her children die without baptism" but that she was "disgusted with the whites," and she would "not see any of them in her court with the missionaries."

She sought once again to expand the kingdom into Portuguese domains in 1706, and it was probably for this reason that she had ambassadors in the court of Kongo's King Pedro IV that year. But her attempts to do this were thwarted, as Portuguese forces were too strong and she abandoned the attempt. Nevertheless, a state of constant low level conflict between her army and the Portuguese at Ambaca and Cahenda led to the virtual depopulation of the country to the west of Matamba, as the people either fled or were captured and deported to the Americas. Those captured by the Portuguese tended to be sent to Brazil, those captured by Verónica were often sold to Vili merchants, based in the Kingdom of Loango to the north, and subsequently sold to English, Dutch, or French merchants who frequented that coast.

Verónica continued her attempts to expand Matamba's control over the territories that it claimed in the early seventeenth century. She died in 1721 and was succeeded by her son, Afonso I.

== Notes ==
Verónica I of Matamba House of Guterres
Regnal titles
Preceded by Francisco I	Queen of Ndongo and Matamba; 1681–1721	Succeeded by Afonso I
