= Verónica II of Matamba =

Queen of Ndongo and Matamba

Verónica II Guterres (died 1758) was the queen regnant of the Kingdom of Ndongo and Matamba from 1756 to 1758.

She was the daughter of queen Ana II Guterres and the sister of queen Ana III Guterres. She may have been the biological daughter of Juliana I Guterres, who may have reigned between the death of Afonso I in 1741 and the succession of Ana II in 1742, and adopted by her aunt Ana II as her daughter, but this is unconfirmed. In any case, Verónica was referred to as the daughter of Ana II (which she would have been even if she was adopted), and she was the designated heir to the throne during fourteen year's reign.

In 1756, her mother died and she succeeded her as her designated heir and crown princess. She reigned for about two years. In 1758, Verónica II was deposed in a coup d'etat by her sister, who took the throne under the name of Ana III and had her executed by decapitation. In 1767, Ana III was herself deposed and executed by her nephew Francisco II Kalwete ka Mbandi who was possibly the son of Verónica II.

Verónica II of Matamba House of Guterres
Regnal titles
Preceded by Ana II Guterres	Queen of Ndongo and Matamba; 1756–1758	Succeeded by Ana III
