= List of rulers of Matamba =

The following is an incomplete list of the rulers of the Kingdom of Matamba, a late medieval West−Central African state centered in a region of present day Angola.

== History ==
The Kingdom of Matamba was ruled by native Northern Mbundu kings and queens since at least the early 16th century. During much of this time it was a nominal vassal to the powerful Kingdom of Kongo to its north.

In 1631, Matamba was invaded by the warrior queen Nzinga Mbande of the neighboring Northern Mbundu Kingdom of Ndongo. From then on, the state would be ruled by Ndongo monarchs.

== List ==
=== Matamba monarchs ===
Name	Lifespan	Reign start	Reign end	Notes	Family	Image
Kambolo Matamba		fl. 1590s	fl. 1590s			
Mwongo Matamba			1631	Queen		

=== Ndongo monarchs ===
Name	Lifespan	Reign start	Reign end	Notes	Family	Image
Nzinga Mbande or Ana de Sousa Nzinga Mbande	c. 1583 – 17 December, 1663	1631	1663			
Mukambu		1663	1666	Sister of Nzinga Mbande		
Njinga a Mona		1666	1669	Husband of Mukambu		
João		1669	1670	Descendant of Ngola Kiluanji, relative of Nzinga and Mukambu	Guterres dynasty	
Njinga a Mona		1670	1671	2nd reign		
Francisco I		1671	1681	Son of João	Guterres dynasty	
Verónica I		1681	1721	Sister of Francisco I	Guterres dynasty	
Afonso I		1721	1741	Son of Verónica I	Guterres dynasty	
Ana II		1741	1756	Granddaughter of Verónica I	Guterres dynasty	
Verónica II		1756	1758	Daughter of Ana II	Guterres dynasty	
Ana III		1758	1767	Sister of Verónica II	Guterres dynasty	
Francisco II		1767	1810	Nephew of Ana III	Guterres dynasty	
Ndala Kamana		1810	1833	Grandson of Ana III	Guterres dynasty	
Idda Ritjaso		unknown	unknown		Guterres dynasty	

== See also ==
- Matamban and Ndongo monarchs
- Former monarchies of Africa
