= Ana III of Matamba =

Ana III Guterres (died 1767) was the queen regnant of the Kingdom of Ndongo and Matamba (in modern-day Angola) from 1758 to 1767.

She was the daughter of queen Ana II Guterres and the sister of queen Verónica II Guterres. She had two daughters, Kamana and Murili. In 1756, her mother died and was succeeded by her sister Verónica II, who had been their mother's designated heir and crown princess. In 1758, after only about two years' of reign, Verónica II was deposed in a coup d'etat by her sister, who took the throne under the name of Ana III and had her sister executed by decapitation. Ana III reigned for about twelve years.

In 1767, she was deposed and executed by her nephew Francisco II Kalwete ka Mbandi (possibly the son of Verónica II). Her death resulted in a long-standing succession crisis, in which her two daughters left for Kidona in Kwanza, where they proclaimed the Kingdom of Jinga under the rule of queen Kamana, contesting the right of Francisco II after their mother and establishing a rival Kingdom within the borders of his own Kingdom. The conflict lasted until 1800, when Francisco II recognized the Kingdom of Jinga and acknowledged Kamala's right to rule there. The Kingdom of Ndongo and Matamba was not united until 1810, when Francisco II and Kamala both died and the Portuguese supported Kamala's son Ndala Kamana (d. 1833), when he successfully united the Kingdom under his own rule.

Issue

- Kamana (d. 1810), queen regnant of Jinga 1767-1810.
- Princess Murili

Ana III of Matamba House of Guterres
Regnal titles
Preceded by Verónica II Guterres	Queen of Ndongo and Matamba; 1758–1767	Succeeded by Francisco II
