= Kulashingo of Kasanje =

Kasanje ka Kulashingo was a kinguri or ruler of the Imbangala kingdom of Kasanje.

== Life ==
The Kasanje Imbangala appear to have first migrated west with their war-band out of the Lunda region, and settled within the Kingdom of Ndongo with the permission of its ruler. They were quickly thrown out, however, and migrated south beyond the Cuanza.

Kulashingo was the ruling kinguri when the Kasanje Imbangala first allied with the Portuguese. He agreed to an alliance around 1612. They settled with their camps as mercenaries in the fringes of the Portuguese in Angola, along with other Imbangala bands. Kulashingo helped the Portuguese against Ndongo in 1618 and 1619, only to then defect once more to engage in independent raiding. The neutralization of the Kasanje Imbangala was one of the main points of the peace negotiations between Portugal and Ndongo, negotiated personally by Nzinga Mbande.

The Kasanje state, referred to by the Portuguese as ensaca de Cassange, was invaded in 1622 by Portuguese forces led by Captain-Major Pedro de Sousa Coelho, who destroyed several Imbangala villages along with the capital. Kulashingo was captured and taken to Luanda, where he was publicly executed. Kalunga was elected kinguri in his stead, and the Imbangala migrated away towards the east, to settle along the banks of the Kwango.

== See also ==
- History of Angola
- Angolan Wars
