= Tembandumba =

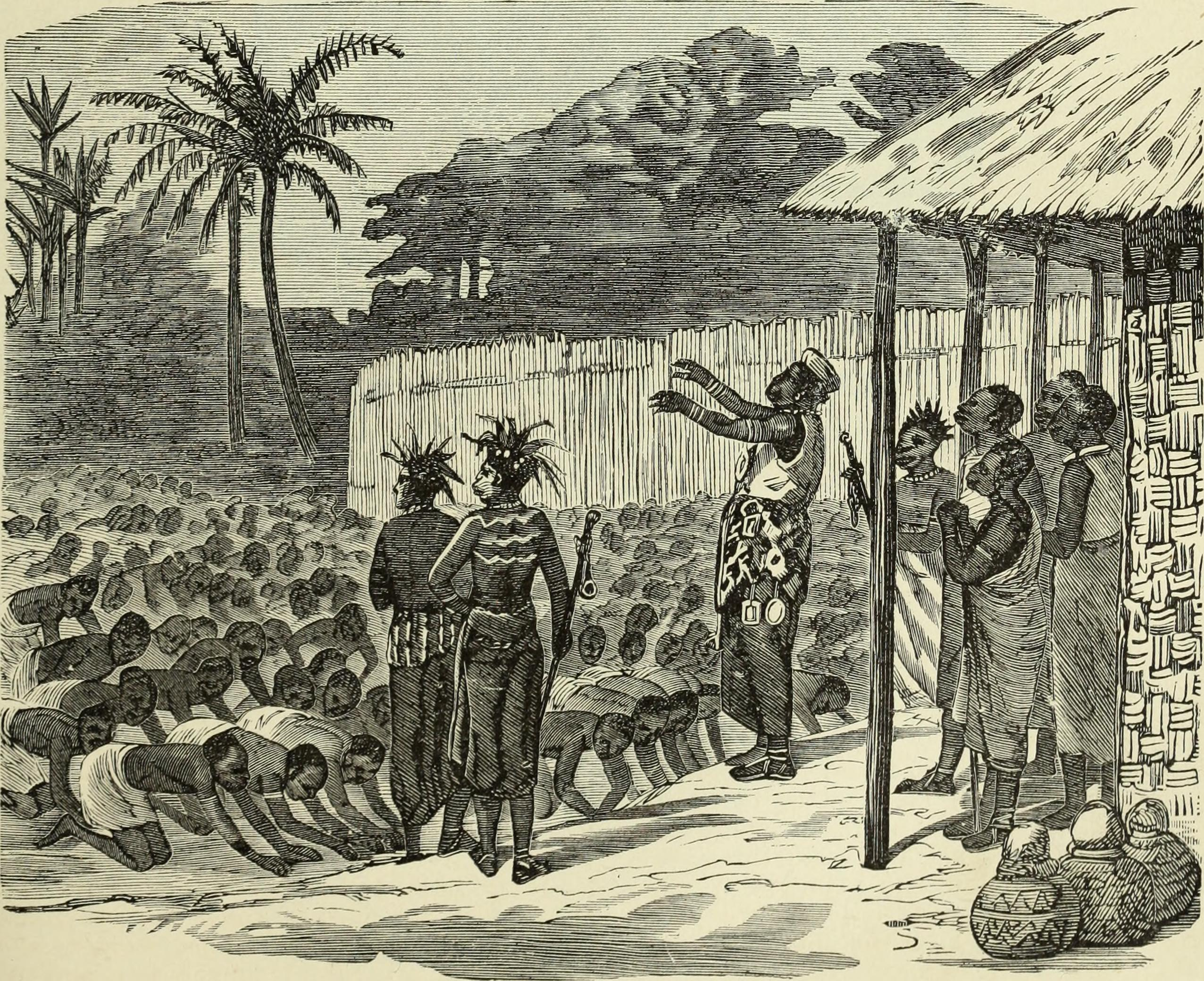
Tembandumba

Tembandumba, also spelled Tembo a Ndumbo, was a ruler of the Imbangala Jagas of what is now Angola.

Tembandumba's mother was Mussasa, whom she rebelled against and declared herself queen. After taking power, she organized the Jaga for war by demanding that infants be killed by their mothers and their bodies pounded into ointment, which was mixed with herbs. In order to enforce this decree, she assembled the tribe and pounded her own infant son to death on a mortar and prepared the ointment. She then rubbed it on her body, declaring that it would make her invulnerable. The women of the tribe immediately imitated her actions with their own children. She eventually encountered resistance to this practice in the tribe, and had to resort to using only male infants captured in war for the ointment.

Tembandumba was described as being repulsive and having only one eye, having lost the other in battle. According to a 1910 European source, she would take lovers, but would kill them after a brief dalliance. She was eventually poisoned by one of her lovers.

== Succession ==
Preceded by Mussasa	Ruler of the Jagas	Succeeded by Culemba
