= Pascoal of Kasanje =

Dom Pascoal Rodrigues Machado of Kasanje was an Ambundu king of Kasanje and the first Christian ruler of that Imbangala kingdom.

== Life ==
Born Ngonga a Mbande in 1608, at Ndamba-Aquitala, two days journey of Ambaca, he was given the category of nganga or shaman, healer. He was captured in his youth and taken to the quilombo, or war-camp of Kasanje Kalunga ka Kinguri. Kalunga took him in as his son, and Ngonga, a Mbande, demonstrated a level of bravery, strength, and cruelty that quickly made him popular. He was known to kill animals with his bare hands by pulling their hind legs apart, and engaged in human sacrifice and ritual cannibalism of war prisoners. In 1655, he strangled his adoptive father, took the throne and his name, and sacrificed 300 people in his funeral.

The Portuguese governor of Angola Luís Martins de Sousa Chichorro pitted the Imbangala ruler against Queen Nzinga, a rival of Portugal in Angola. He sought a closer relation with Portugal, fearing Nzingas rapprochement with Luanda might endanger him. Either at his own invitation or just to have an envoy retrieve Portuguese prisoners, in 1655 the governor dispatched the Capuchin friar Antonio de Sarravezza to the Imbangala war-camp and capital at Cassoco, in Ganguela. At Kasanje, Sarravezza managed little in terms of proselytism and was nearly lynched. He was replaced two years later by Giovanni Cavazzi da Montecuccolo, who converted the Imbangala ruler to Catholicism on 9 June 1657. He adopted the name Pascoal Rodrigues Machado and married his favourite concubine, Dona Ana Catala. Though satisfied with his conversion, Dom Pascoal continued to support idolatry, polygamy and cannibalism. Christianity was however rejected by all of his subjects besides the resident Portuguese merchants. The Portuguese also conferred on him the rank of general. Portugal also appointed to his kingdom a capitão-mor, who in effect acted as a resident or ambassador and regulated the Portuguese market fair that took place there.

Still in 1657, Dom Pascoal attacked Oaco and torched the village of Quibaia, belonging to soba Quibaia-Quiandongo, who sought refuge in an island on the Cuanza river. He requested aid from the Portuguese governor and was visited by Cavazzi. Qubaia-Quiandongo converted to Catholicism and adopted the name Dom Luís António.

While at Cassoco, Cavazzi found an orphaned child in the countryside. The Italian missionary managed to have a mother who lived within the camp adopt her, but this caused outrage as the Imbangala considered the camp to have been desecrated. Dom Pascoal had the child executed, and an unguent made from her remains. The war-camp was then torched and a new one built at Palongolo.

A new Portuguese religious mission to Kasanje in 1660 yielded no results. The missionary Cavazzi encouraged the authorities of Kasanje to ban infanticide, cannibalism, human sacrifice, and expel the traditional shamans, but aside from banning cannibalism in times of peace, the imbangala elite refused to. King Pascoal Machado told Cavazzi that "we conquered these provinces of Ganguela and others without this Zambi of yours called Deus and without Him we shall do the same in the future as we have done in the past."

Dom Pascoal fought actively against Nzinga in the 1660s and south of the Cuanza, eventually managing to expand to the territory bordering the central highlands, where he developed a long-term rivalry with Muzumbo a Kalunga, the mightiest late seventeenth-century power in the region. In 1670s he established contact with the Lunda Empire and became an important slave broker.

== Death ==
Dom Pascoal died around 1679 and was succeeded by Kitamba Kia Kaita Pascoal Machado or Pascoal II. Yet interventions by Matamba caused him to be deposed and replaced with Kinguri Kia Kasanje. This would ultimately result in an intervention by Portugal and the Battle of Catole between joint Portuguese-Imbangala forces against Matamba.

== See also ==
- Angolan Wars
