= Kulembebe =

Precolonial state in West-Central Africa

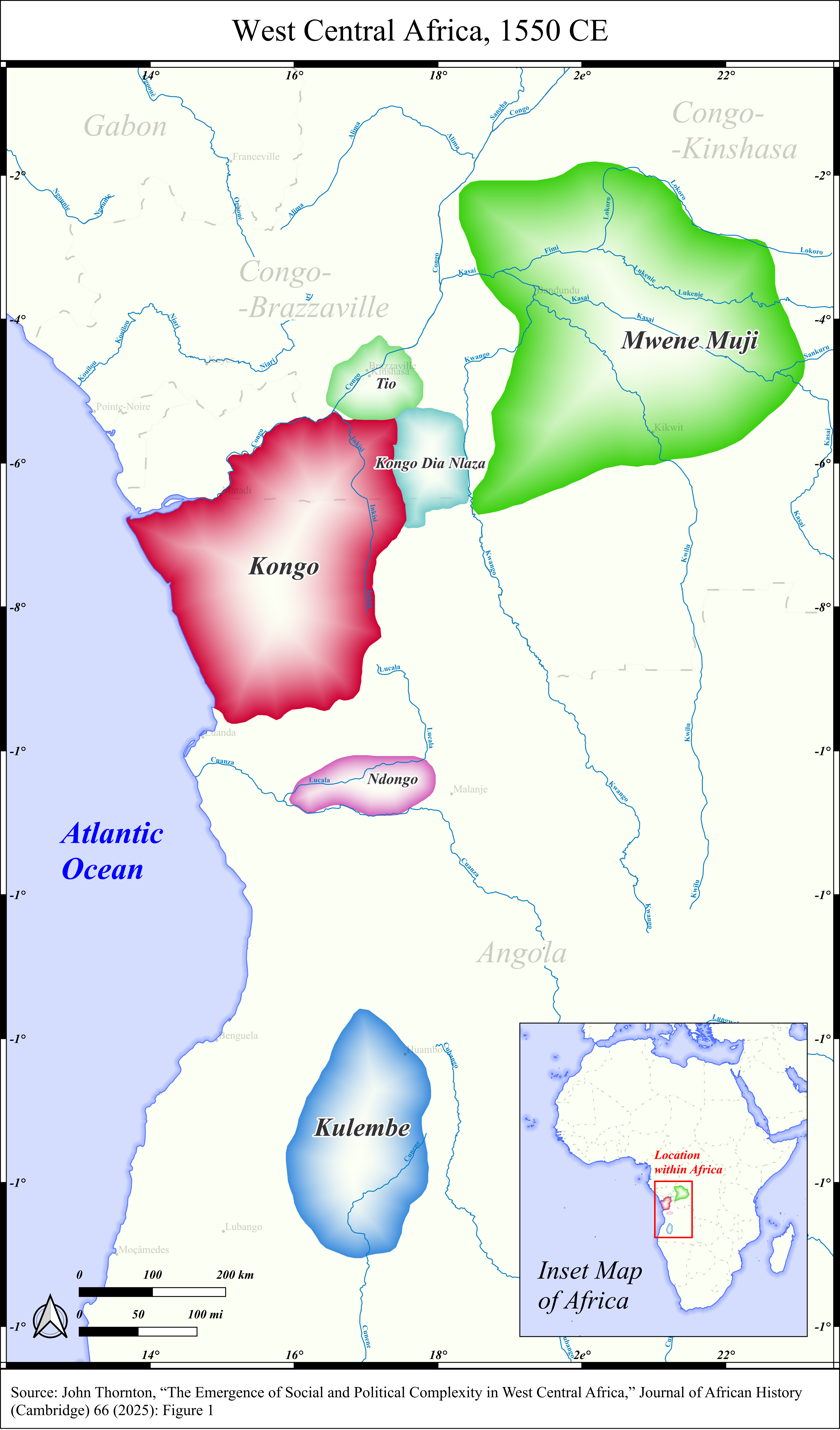
The Kingdom of Kulembe c. 1550 according to John Thornton

Kulembebe or Kulembe was an early kingdom in modern-day Angola. Despite being mentioned in Portuguese records and oral traditions, little is known about the state, other than that it was a likely predecessor to the Ovimbundu kingdoms. Building on the work of Joseph Miller and Jan Vansina, John Thornton has proposed Kulembebe as a probable centre for state formation in West-Central Africa, possibly dating back to the 13th century.

== Historiography ==
Writing in 1976, Joseph Miller considered Kulembe to be a title held by a line of monarchs whose state covered part of the Benguela plateau (east of Benguela) "long before the mid-sixteenth century", and was the antecedent to the Ovimbundu kingdoms. He considered its capital to have been located near the sources of the Longa, Kuvo, and Ngango rivers. Several 17th-century records referred to Kulembe as "a great and powerful king", though Miller considered their vagueness to indicate that the state had deteriorated by then. While Ovimbundu traditions do not refer to Kulembe and instead focus on the later kingdoms from the 17th century onwards, mention has been retained in Mbundu genealogies, and in titles such as that of the Libolo ruler (Hango dya Kulembe, referred to as 'son' of Kulembe by Mbundu traditions). Miller considered the vunga institution, which involved positional succession and perpetual kinship, (Note: "Positional succession" was where a successor would take on their predecessor's identity, relationships, and duties, while "perpetual kinship" involved permanent kinship ties between positions.) to have originated in Kulembe before disseminating to other polities. He also thought that titles such as that of the Libolo ruler served as short 'perpetual genealogies' which referred to earlier senior titles as 'perpetual fathers'.

In Paths in the Rainforest (1990) and How Societies are Born (2004), Jan Vansina used a vast linguistic database to determine the origins of Central African political terminologies, and therefore that of political innovations. Using Vansina's findings, in 2020 John Thornton identified four centres of state formation, one of which was in the Angolan Highlands in central Angola.

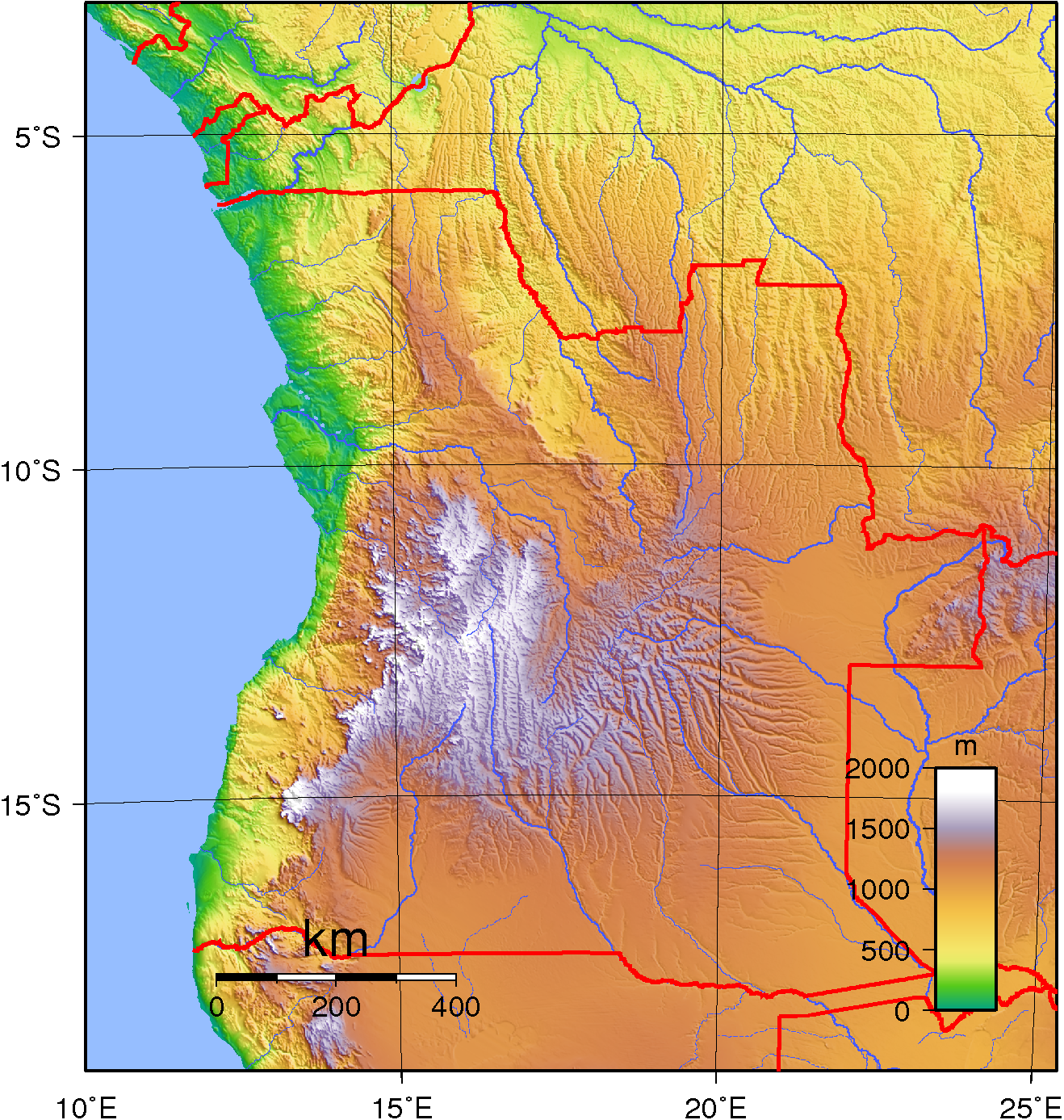
A topographical map of Angola, showing the Angolan Highlands in white

Based on Miller's work, in 2025 Thornton linked "Kulembe" to the "Climbebe" mentioned in Filippo Pigafetta's Relatione del Reame di Congo (1591). Pigafetta, based on a report from Luanda c. 1579–1583, wrote that "near the Cape of Good Hope there is a king called Matama and the provinces ruled by him are called Climbebe". Thornton revised it as "Kulembebe", and wrote that it may have been located near Feti la Choya in southern Angola (which Vansina described as an "Angolan Zimbabwe") or had its capital there, possibly dating from around the 13th century. He also considered it plausible that Kulembebe was destroyed in the late-16th century by Imbangala groups. He added that as of 2025 "further investigation of the stone building culture of southern Angola may give insight into Kulembebe, the oldest-known polity and likely source of at least the terminology for Ndongo and the Ovimbundu kingdoms".
