= Fort São Filipe de Benguela =

Building in Angola

- Fortaleza de São Filipe de Benguela
- Benguela in Angola

Location
- Coordinates: 12°35′11″S 13°23′47″E

Site history
- Built: 1617
- Built by: Portuguese Empire
- Events: Dutch-Portuguese War

The Fort of São Filipe de Benguela (Fortaleza de São Filipe de Benguela in Portuguese) was located by the Baía das Vacas, in the city and municipality of Benguela, capital of the province of Benguela, on the south coast of Angola.

== History ==
During the Iberian Union, Philip III of Spain, by royal decree, determined the separation of the "kingdom of Benguela" from the kingdom of Angola:

"From my royal and absolute power, I am pleased and I consider good, for this present provision, the captaincy, conquest and government of the provinces of the said Kingdom of Benguela (...) and through it I construct and the said kingdom in a new government, so that henceforth they have separate jurisdiction and governor.

With this measure the king intended to implement the search and exploitation of the copper mines of Sumbe Ambela, north of the mouth of the river Cuvo (or Queve), and south of Benguela-Velha, an earlier Portuguese settlement in the region, founded in 1587 and later extinct, close to the current Porto Amboim.

Manuel Cerveira Pereira was appointed as Governor, Conqueror, and Settler of Benguela, and simultaneously Governor of Angola. He left Luanda on the 11th of April 1617 in command of a force of 130 men and headed south along the coast to Baía das Vacas, which he reached on the 17th of May. There he founded the town of Benguela, which was to be the capital of the new Portuguese dominion.

The village and its fort were occupied by forces of the Dutch West India Company in 1641, and occupied until they were recaptured by a Portuguese force under the command of Salvador Correia de Sá e Benevides in 1648.

The fort was built in 1661 of rammed earth. It measured 300 meters by 150 meters and stood by the sea-side. It was renovated in 1694.

Benguela was almost totally destroyed by a French naval force in 1705 and rebuilt in 1710. The fort was again renovated in 1769, and served as prison and deposit for persons banished from Portugal until it was demolished between 1906 and 1919.

The Kingdom of Benguela was administered autonomously between 1617 and 1869.

It is marked in the "Sketch of the school map of the Colony of Angola" (1929), coordinated by Armando Teles and designed by Henrique Moreira.

== See also ==
- Portuguese Angola
- History of Angola
- Colonial history of Angola
