= Luís Lopes de Sequeira =

Portuguese military commander

Luís Lopes de Sequeira (died 4 September 1681) was a military commander in Portuguese Angola.

== Biography ==
Of mixed Portuguese and Angolan descent, Sequeira rose to the rank of captain-general of the forces in the colony, and led the army that defeated and killed King António I of Kongo at the Battle of Mbwila on 29 October 1665.

Sequeira was assassinated during the Battle of Katole by a Portuguese soldier on 4 September 1681.

Sequeira is the subject of a play by José Mena Abrantes, Sequeira, Luís Lopes ou o mulato dos prodígios (first performed 1995).

== See also ==
- Angolan Wars
