= Nzari =

Nzari (often spelled Zary, Zarry, Zerri) was a small kingdom located on the north bank of the Congo River. It is mentioned in Dutch sources of the seventeenth century in particular. It is not clear from these sources whether the territory was independent or a part of another political entity, such as Loango. It was not found in the titles of the kings of Kongo, for example, Afonso I of Kongo's list of titles in his letter to the Pope of 1535.

According to the Dutch geographer, Olfert Dapper, Nzari was the root of the Kingdom of Loango.
