= Mbundu =

Mbundu may refer to:

- Northern Mbundu people (Ambundu)
  - North Mbundu language (Kimbundu)
- Southern Mbundu people (Ovimbundu alternatively Southern Ambundu
  - South Mbundu language (Umbundu)
