= Mussasa =

17th-century Imbangala queen of Matamba

- Born: 17th century
- Died: 17th century
- Occupations: Queen regnant, military commander
- Known for: Expanding the Matamba Empire; training Queen Tembandumba
- Title: Queen of the Imbangala
- Spouse: Donji
- Children: Tembandumba

Mussasa was a 17th-century Imbangala Jagas queen regnant.

== Biography ==
Mussasa was the wife of Donji, one of Zimbo's captains and the governor of Matamba. Mussasa was known to be a fierce warrior and even to rival men of her time. Zimbo, the ruler of Jagas, was succeeded by one of his captains, the husband of Mussasa. Soon after the death of the King Zimbo, Mussasa's husband Donji began to take over his neighboring states. Mussasa soon after the death of her husband, continued the domination and extended her empire. Her nation was on the Cunene river in what is now Angola. She expanded her empire greatly through her military, and led soldiers into battle. Mussusa educated her daughter Tembandumba to be a soldier and took her to fight side by side in battle. Tembandumba, who developed a reputation of being as fierce as her mother, succeeded Mussasa as queen.

Preceded by Donji	Ruler of the Jagas	Succeeded by Tembandumba
