= Kingdom of Libolo =

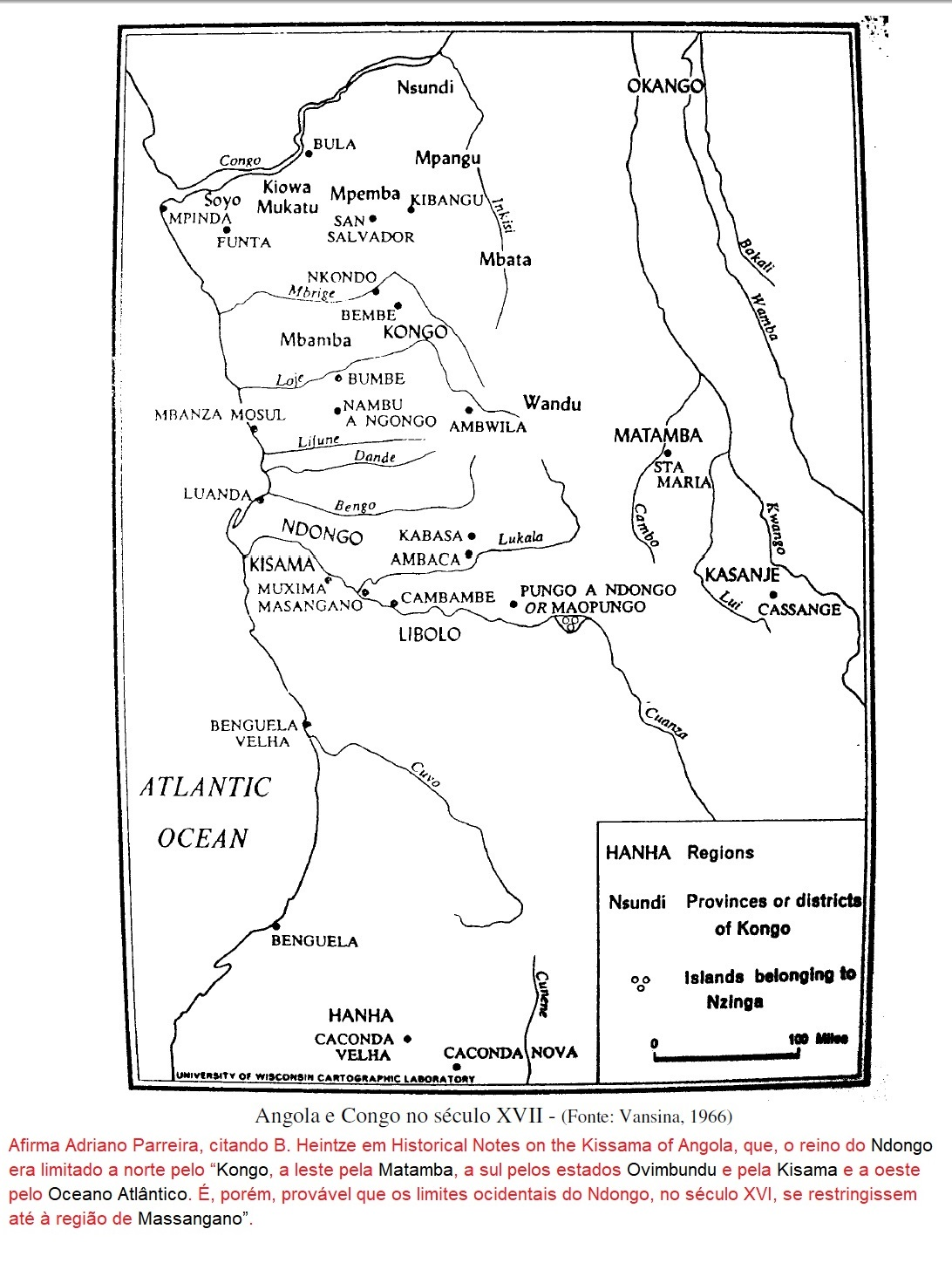
Location of Libolo within Angola.

The Kingdom of Libolo was a pre-colonial African kingdom in what is now Angola, located on the left bank of the Cuanza river. The political methods of the Libolo differed from other ethnically Ambundu kingdoms and they may have had their roots in an older and obscure kingdom called Kulembe. Libolo kings, or hango appointed regional governors who would receive official insignia, could visit his subjects and were personally responsible for their loyalty.

The Libolo also developed important initiation rites associated with the training of their warriors. For a brief period probably in the sixteenth century, Libolo expanded north of the Cuanza and dominated part of the Luanda plateau. One chief even crossed the plateau to settle in the northern escarpment, where his title is still used by local people. This northern expansion was short lived however, and by the mid sixteenth century the ngola of the Kingdom of Ndongo had confined the Libolo to the south side of the Kwanza.

By the seventheenth century, Libolo was no longer a functioning ethnic or political entity but its name remained in use as a historical reference for the region. Portuguese forces attacked Libolo and penetrated deep into the interior in 1677–1678, but could not control the region. In 1687 they marched on the region once more but also with limited results.

== See also ==
- History of Angola
- Portuguese Angola
