= Andrew Battel =

English traveller (fl. 1565–1614)

Andrew Battel (fl. c. 1565–1614), was an English traveller. His account of his long stay in Portuguese captivity in Angola, and his travels in the region are essential primary sources for the history of that region, particularly for his early account of the Imbangala and his detailed description of Loango.

== Voyage ==
On 20 April 1589 he sailed with Captain Abraham Cocke for Rio de la Plata. After a troublesome voyage they reached the mouth of the river in the autumn, but were forced by hunger and adverse winds to return along the coast of Brazil. Landing at the island of São Sebastião (the site of the present Rio de Janeiro), the crew was separated, and Battel with five companions was carried off by the Indians to the river Janeiro and delivered to the Portuguese. After four months' imprisonment he was transported to Luanda, the Portuguese settlement in Angola. He was imprisoned in that town for four months, and then sent 150 miles up the Kwanza River and confined in a fort, till, through the death of the Portuguese pilot, he was employed to take the governor's pinnace down to Luanda. After an illness of eight months Battel was sent by the governor of Luanda, João Furtado de Mendonça, to Nzari, on the Congo, in a pinnace to collect ivory, wheat, and palm-tree oil. He was successful, and continued to trade for the Portuguese at Loango, but, attempting to escape on a Dutch vessel, he was thrown into prison for two months and then banished to Massangano, a Portuguese fort on the Kwanza River at the eastern end of their domain, where he spent six years. After another abortive flight and consequent imprisonment, he was enrolled in a mixed force of Portuguese and natives and sent on an expedition to Ilambo. In this campaign, which was successful, Battel received a severe wound in the leg.

Afterwards he was employed in trading expeditions along the coast, and on one occasion he was left by the Portuguese as a hostage for two months with the Gaga (his rendering of "Jagas" or Imbangala) of Imbe Kalandula. He was equipped with a musket, and by his shooting gained the favor of this band. He gives a full and striking account of the strange customs and superstitions which he observed among them, particularly of the human sacrifices of which he was an eye-witness. He managed to return to the Portuguese at Massangano, and for his services was made a sergeant. Hearing from some Jesuits that by the accession of James I peace was restored between England and Spain, he obtained the governor's consent to return to England. The promise was retracted, and Battel fled into the woods of Kasanze, a refugee area north of Luanda, where he resolved to wait for a new governor. At length he fell in with a pinnace belonging to an old messmate; he embarked, and was put down at the port of Loango. Here, by virtue of his shooting, he gained the goodwill of the king. At this point the narrative ends with a full description of the different regions of Loango, their natural features, and the customs of the inhabitants. After three years spent in this district Battel returned to England, having been absent eighteen years, and settled at Leigh-on-Sea in Essex. His veracity has been questioned, but his narratives have been partly confirmed by the similar account of the Congo district given by the traveler Duarte Lopes in 1591. Purchas refers to Battel as his neighbor, and testifies to his intelligence and honesty. He speaks of him as still living in his 'Pilgrimage,' the first edition of which was published in 1614.

== Gorillas ==
In Purchas His Pilgrims (1625), Battel mentioned the existence of the gorilla, an animal he named pongo:

This Pongo is in all proportion like a man, but... he is more like a Giant in stature, than a man: for he is very tall, [and] hath a man's face, hollow-eyed, with long haire vpon his browes. His face and eares are without haire, and his hands also. His bodie is full of haire, but not very thicke, and it is a dunnish colour. . . Hee goeth alwaies vpon his legs, and carrieth his hands clasped on the nape of his necke, when he goeth upon the ground... They goe many together, and kill many Negroes that trauaile in the Woods . . . Those Pongos are neuer taken aliue, because they are so strong, that ten men cannot hold one of them...

— Andrew Battel, 1625
