= Kamana, Queen of Jinga =

Monarch of the Kingdom of Jinga

Kamana (also Ana III Kamana) (died 1810) was the queen regnant of the Kingdom of Jinga (in modern-day Angola) from 1767 to 1810.

She was the daughter of queen Ana III Guterres.

In 1767, her mother was deposed and executed by her nephew Francisco II Kalwete ka Mbandi. Her death resulted in a longgoing succession crisis, in which Kamana and her sister Princess Murili left for Kidona in Kwanza, where they proclaimed the Kingdom of Jinga under the rule of queen Kamana, contesting the right of Francisco II after their mother, and establishing a rival Kingdom within the borders of his own Kingdom.

The conflict lasted until 1800, when Francisco II recognized the Kingdom of Jinga and acknowledged Kamana's right to rule there. The Kingdom of Ndongo and Matamba was not united until 1810, when Francisco II and Kamana both died and the Portuguese supported Kamana's son Ndala Kamana (d. 1833), when he successfully united the Kingdom under his own rule.

== Issue ==
- Ndala Kamana (d. 1833), king of Ndongo and Matamba in 1810-1833.
