= Njinga a Mona =

Imbangala general and claimant to the throne of Matamba

Njinga a Mona (also called Nzinga a Mona or Njinga Mona) was an Imbangala leader who rose to prominence as a general in the service of the famous Queen Nzinga of Ndongo and Matamba. In the late 1660s and early 1670s, he fought João Guterres Ngola Kanini and his sons for control of Matamba, but was ultimately defeated.

Njinga a Mona first became an Imbangala when he was captured by them as a child, and he was then raised in their ways. Although he was lowborn, his name meant 'child of Njinga' (that is, of Queen Nzinga), signifying their close relationship as he rose to become the most senior military commander in her forces. In 1647, after the Battle of Kombi, he commanded forces that attempted to take the fortress at Massangano and rescue Nzinga's sister Mukambu, but he was unsuccessful due to his lack of artillery.

The role of Njinga a Mona in the conversion of Matamba to Christianity was complex. In 1655, Njinga a Mona reported that he received a scolding vision after discarding a captured Christian cross, whereupon he retrieved it and brought it back to Queen Nzinga. This episode helped Nzinga justify the introduction of Christianity to her people, which was part of a deal with the Portuguese that took effect in 1656, which also saw Mukambu's release from Portuguese captivity. Afterwards, Njinga a Mona married Mukambu, who became Nzinga's heir. Njinga a Mona was also the first of Nzinga's officials to be baptised.

On the other hand, the introduction of Christianity created distance between Njinga a Mona and Queen Nzinga. The rise of Christianity was paralleled by a shift away from the Imbangala traditions in which Njinga a Mona had been raised, as well as an increased emphasis on dynastic succession and noble lineage that disadvantaged him given his low birth. In contrast, under Imbangala traditions, Njinga a Mona would have been the queen's obvious successor. As a result, Njinga a Mona became the leader of an Imbangala opposition faction in the court. In 1663, the night before the dedication of the largest church yet built in the region, Njinga a Mona's brother and sister both died within hours of each other, leading Christian missionaries to suspect they poisoned themselves in a bid to undermine Christianity in Matamba.

These tensions did not erupt into open civil war while Nzinga lived, nor during the succeeding reign of Njinga a Mona's wife Mukambu (1663–1666). However, on Mukambu's death, Njinga a Mona attempted to take power, and was proclaimed the legitimate successor by a traditional nganga priest claimed to be possessed by Nzinga's spirit. The royal council disagreed and expelled Njinga a Mona; instead, they eventually crowned João Guterres Ngola Kanini, a member of the Christian faction who was part of the Ndongo royal family and thus a relative of Nzinga and Mukambu. When João Guterres died in 1670, Njinga a Mona returned and drove João's eldest son Luis into exile. However, another son, António Guterres, defeated Njinga a Mona, and in 1671 the royal council installed a third son, Francisco I Guterres Ngola Kanini, as king.

== See also ==
- Angolan Wars

Njinga a Mona
Regnal titles
Preceded by Mukambu	King of Ndongo and Matamba; 1666-1669	Succeeded by João
Preceded by João	King of Ndongo and Matamba; 1670-1671	Succeeded by Francisco I
