= Battle of Katole =

1681 battle

- Part of the Angolan Wars
Date	4 September 1681
Location	Katole, Angola
Result	Portuguese victory

Belligerents
Kingdom of Matamba	Portuguese Empire

Commanders and leaders
King Francisco Guterres Ngola kannini †	Luís Lopes de Sequeira X

Strength
Unknown	530 Portuguese infantry 37 cavalry 10,000 empacaceiros

Casualties and losses
Unknown	Heavy

The Battle of Katole was a military engagement between forces of Portuguese Angola and the Kingdom of Matamba. The battle took place on 4 September 1681 at Katole in what is today Angola.

== Prelude to battle ==
The kingdom of Matamba, also known as the kingdom of Matamba and Ndongo, lay in what is today eastern Angola. It was created by the warrior queen Nzinga via her 1631 conquest of the kingdom from its BaKongo vassal. Throughout the mid-17th century, Queen Nzinga fought a guerilla war against the Portuguese colony of Angola to regain her throne and protect her people, the Mbundu, from the slave trade. By 1657, the queen had regained her traditional capital and ended the wars with Angola in her favor. After her death in 1663, the kingdom she fought so hard to establish devolved into civil war. The war did not end until 1680 when Francisco Guterres Ngola kannini, Njinga's nephew, defeated one of his aunt's former commanders and became king.

== Casus belli ==
In 1681, King Francisco invaded the neighboring Imbangala kingdom of Kassanje to place his own candidate on the throne. While on campaign, he robbed the pombeiros, Afro-Portuguese slaving agents, and beheaded the kingdom's ruler. This angered the Portuguese, who had never been comfortable with an independent Matamba in the first place. The Portuguese immediately sent the victor of the Battle of Mbwila, Luís Lopes de Sequeira, to crush the kingdom.

== Battle ==
On September 4, 1681, Sequeira arrived at Katole, which was but three days' march from the royal kabasa or palace. He came with over ten thousand infantry and even a small complement of horses (almost unheard of in Central African warfare). He was met by King Francisco's forces sometime before dawn that day. In the course of the fighting, Francisco was killed and Sequeira was assassinated by a Portuguese soldier. Matamba's forces retreated, and the Portuguese were able to claim at least a tactical victory by holding their position.

== Aftermath ==
Despite taking the field, which had never been an objective in the first place, the Portuguese losses were such that the invasion of Matamba's capital was called off. After encamping at Katole for nearly thirty days, the Portuguese and their African allies retired to Mbaka under the command of João António de Brito.

== See also ==
- History of Angola
- Kingdom of Matamba
- African military systems to 1800

== Sources ==
- Battell, Andrew & E.G. Ravenstein (2007). The Strange Adventures of Andrew Battell of Leigh, in Angola and the Adjoining Regions. Whitefish: Kessinger Publishing, LLC. pp. 232 Pages. ISBN 0-548-23252-0.
