= Bié Plateau =

Plateau in central Angola

- Plateau
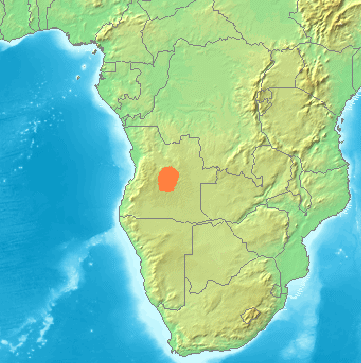
- Bié Plateau
- Interactive map of Bié Plateau
- Location: Central Angola
- Elevation: 1,520 metres (4,990 ft)
- Highest elevation: 1,830 metres (6,000 ft)

The Bié Plateau or Central Plateau of Angola is a plateau that occupies most of central Angola. The elevation of the plateau is from 1,520 m (4,990 ft) to 1,830 m (6,000 ft).

Five major rivers have their headwaters or significant tributaries on the plateau: the Cunene, Cuanza, Okavango, Zambezi, and Congo rivers. It has relatively fertile soil and high rainfall, compared to the coastal region of Angola to its west. Its climate is cool and has enough rainfall to allow for the cultivation of coffee, corn, rice, sisal, sugarcane, and peanuts. Along the more elevated parts, more rain falls, but it gradually declines further within. About half of the rural population of Angola reside on the Bié plateau. The Benguela Railway connects it to the ocean and its principal towns are Huambo and Kuito.

Historically, the plateau was deeply affected by slavery, with estimates of as much as half the local population being enslaved in the mid-1800s.
