= Kingdom of Matamba =

Kingdom in modern-day Angola

The Kingdom of Matamba (pre-1550–1744) was an African state located in what is now the Baixa de Cassange region of Malanje Province of modern-day Angola. Joined to the Kingdom of Ndongo by Queen Nzinga in 1631, the state had many male and female rulers. It was a powerful kingdom that long resisted Portuguese colonisation attempts, but was integrated into Portuguese Angola in the late nineteenth century.

== Origins and early history ==
The first documentary mention of the Kingdom of Matamba is a reference to it giving tribute to the King of Kongo, then Afonso I of Kongo, in 1530. In 1535 Afonso subsequently mentioned Matamba as one of the regions over which he ruled as king in his titles. There is no further information on the kingdom's early history and modern oral traditions do not seem to illuminate this at the present state of research. However, it does not seem likely that Kongo had any more than a light and symbolic presence in Matamba, and its rulers were probably quite independent. Matamba undoubtedly had closer relations with its south southeastern neighbor Ndongo, then a powerful kingdom as well as with Kongo.

During the mid-sixteenth century Matamba was ruled by Ngola Njinga, who received missionaries from Kongo, then a Christian kingdom, dispatched by King Diogo I (1545–1561). Though this ruler received the missionaries and perhaps allowed them to preach, there is no indication that the kingdom converted to Christianity.

The arrival of the Portuguese colonists under Paulo Dias de Novais in Luanda in 1575 altered the political situation as the Portuguese immediately became involved in Ndongo's affairs, and war broke out between Ndongo and Portugal in 1579. Although Matamba played a small role in the early wars, the threat of a Portuguese victory stirred the ruler of Matamba (probably a king named Kambolo Matamba) to intervene. He sent an army to aid Ndongo against the Portuguese, and with these forces, the combined armies were able to defeat and rout Portuguese forces at the Battle of the Lukala in 1590.

== Portuguese attacks and Ndongo's conquest ==
In 1618 the Portuguese governor of Angola, Luis Mendes de Vasconcelos, launched a large-scale attack on Ndongo, using newly acquired Imbangala allies. The allied Imbangala, mercenary soldiers from south of the Kwanza River, turned the day and allowed Mendes de Vasconcelos' forces to sack Ndongo's capital and pillage the country. During the following two years, Mendes de Vasconcelos' son João led a detachment of Portuguese and Imbangala forces into Matamba where they did great damage. During this time the Imbangala band of Kasanje deserted the Portuguese and continued a campaign of destruction in Matamba. Thousands of Matamba subjects were killed and thousands more taken to America as slaves. It is during this period, for example, that the ethnonym "Matamba" appears in slave inventories in Spanish America in considerable numbers.

Ndongo continued to suffer attacks from Portuguese forces, and in 1624 King Njinga Mbandi (also known as Nzinga) took over as ruler of that country. She continued the war unsuccessfully against Portugal and was forced to flee the country in 1626 and then again in 1629. During her second flight Njinga entered Matamba and her forces routed the army of Matamba's ruler, “Queen” Mwongo Matamba, capturing her and taking her prisoner. From at least 1631 onward, Njinga made Matamba her capital, joining it to the Kingdom of Ndongo.

== The joint kingdom of Matamba and Ndongo: Njinga and her successors ==
Ngola Njinga ruled in Matamba from 1624 until her death in 1663. During this time she integrated the country into her domains and thousands of her former subjects who had fled Portuguese attacks with her settled there. She made several wars against Kasanje especially in 1634–5. In 1639 she received a Portuguese peace mission which did not achieve a treaty, but did reestablish relations between her and the Portuguese. When the Dutch took over Luanda in 1641, Njinga immediately sent ambassadors to make an alliance with them. During these years, she moved her capital from Matamba to Kavanga, where she conducted operations against the Portuguese. Though Ndongo forces won a significant victory over the Portuguese in at the Battle of Kombi in 1647, nearly forcing them to abandon the country and laying siege to their inland capital of Masangano, a Portuguese relief force led by Salvador de Sá in 1648 drove out the Dutch and forced Njinga to return to Matamba. Although she maintained a symbolic capital at Kindonga, an island in the Kwanza River where she and her predecessor had ruled, the real capital was at the town of Matamba (Santa Maria de Matamba). Njinga had been baptized as Ana de Sousa while in Luanda in 1622, and in 1654 she began peace overtures to Portugal.

Njinga hoped that a peaceful relationship with Portugal would allow her to settle her kingdom and determine a successor, as she had no children. She formed a close alliance with a related family, whose leader João Guterres Ngola Kanini, became one of her most important councillors. She was also anxious to remove Imbangala forces, led by Njinga Mona, from her army and place them under her direct control. For this reason she also sought to reconcile with the Catholic Church. This strategy was successful, she signed a peace treaty in 1657 and Italian Capuchin missionaries began working in her lands. They regarded Njinga in her later days as a model Christian and thousands of Matamba subjects were baptized.

However, reintegration in the Christian community did not solve her problems, and there were still troubling succession issues. The church refused to recognize a dynastic marriage between João Guterres and her sister Barbara, because Guterres had a wife at the Portuguese fort of Mbaka where he had once been prisoner. Instead, Barbara married Njinga Mona. Similarly, although the non-and even anti-Christian Imbanagala allowed Njinga to alter some of their customs, Njinga Mona's power was unchecked in the army.

=== Civil war ===
After Njinga's death, a period of tension, punctuated by civil war, broke out. Barbara succeeded Njinga, but Njinga Mona seized power following her death in 1666. João Guterres managed to temporarily oust Njinga Mona in 1669, but he returned and reclaimed power in 1670. However, João's son António defeated Njinga Mona soon afterwards, and in 1671 the royal council installed another son of João, Francisco I, as king.

=== Battle of Katole ===
In 1681 Francisco became involved in a war with neighboring Kasanje, in which he sought to promote interests of one of the candidates to the throne. The Portuguese intervened in this war and invaded Matamba with a force of over 40,000 troops, the largest military force Portugal had even mobilized in Angola. The army penetrated to Katole, where Francisco launched a successful dawn attack on 4 September 1681, inflicting heavy casualties on the Portuguese army. However, Imbangala forces in the Portuguese army managed to stiffen resistance, and in the ensuing battle, Francisco and several of his relatives were killed. The Portuguese army, having suffered heavy losses withdrew to Ambaca and then to Masangano.

== Queen Verónica ==
Francisco Guterres was succeeded by his sister Verónica I Guterres Kandala Kingwanga, whose long rule from 1681 to 1721 consolidated the control of the Guterres dynasty and created a lasting precedent for female rulers. Verónica was apparently a pious Christian, but also a fervent believer in Matamba's independence. In order to forestall another Portuguese invasion, Verónica sent an embassy to Luanda that negotiated a peace treaty, signed 7 September 1683. In it she accepted nominal vassalage, agreed to return Portuguese prisoners taken at the battle of Katole, allowed missionaries into the country and permitted agents of Portuguese free passage through her lands. She also agreed to acknowledge the independence of Kasanje and to renounce all claims on the country and to pay 200 slaves over 4 years as compensation.

Verónica, however, was not really cowed, and within a few years was advancing claims as “Queen” of Ndongo and Matamba that rivaled those of her predecessor Njinga. In the process of asserting her claims she was drawn into wars with Portugal in 1689 and again in 1692–3. She also sought some sort of alliance with Kongo in 1706. These wars and the raiding in between major operations led to serious depopulation on the western edges of her domains.

Verónica appears to have been anxious to re-establish a Christian mission in the country, abandoned following the death of Njinga and the civil war that followed. However, in spite of her various entreaties, the mission was not reestablished.

== Later rulers ==
Queen Veronica was succeeded by her son, Afonso Alvares de Pontes. In the 1730s many refugees fleeing the fall of Holo to the advancing forces of the Lunda Empire cane into the kingdom. The Holo refugees created a new Holo domain out of former Matamba areas on the west side of the Kwango River. In the late 174l30s Alfonso used force to stop their attempts to start up trade with the Colony of Angola. Afonso died in 1741 and was succeeded by his cousin Ana.

== The Portuguese invasion of 1744 ==
Ana II (Ana I was King Njinga as Matamba accepted the Christian names of former rulers and their dynasty), who came to power in 1741, faced a Portuguese invasion in 1744. The invasion of Matamba by Portuguese forces in 1744 was one of their largest military operations in the eighteenth century. In the course of their attack, Matamba's army inflicted a serious defeat on the Portuguese, but in spite of this, a remnant of the army managed to reach the capital of Matamba. In order to avoid a long war and to get them to withdraw, Ana II signed a treaty of vassalage with Portugal which renewed points conceded by Verónica in 1683. While the treaty allowed Portugal to claim Matamba as a vassal, and opened up Matamba to Portuguese trade, it had little effect on the real sovereignty of Matmaba, or indeed in the conduct of trade. For example, Ana II continued to insist on dominating the trade with the Lunda Empire and not letting Portuguese agents from the Colony of Angola to go through her domains to establish direct trade.

Ana II, like Verónica before her, was interested in developing Matamba as a Christian country, routinely sending letters to the Capuchin prefect of Congo and Angola or the Portuguese authorities requesting missionaries come and establish permanent bases in her country. While the country was visited by missionaries from Cahenda and also from the Barefoot Carmelites, a permanent mission was not established.

== The divided kingdom ==
Ana II died in 1756 and a civil war broke out at that time among rival contenders for the throne, during which Verónica II ruled briefly for a time but she was overthrown sometime after 1758, leaving Ana III on the throne.

Ana III was in turn overthrown by Kalwete ka Mbandi, a military leader. Kalwete won the war, and was baptized as Francisco II upon taking the throne. However, two of Ana's daughters, Kamana and Murili escaped the civil war, took refuge in the ancient capital of Ndongo on the Kindonga islands and successfully resisted Francisco II's attempts to oust them. From this base, Queen Kamana created a rival kingdom, and in 1767 tried unsuccessfully to obtain Portuguese help against her rival. While the Portuguese governor of the time, Francisco Innocencio de Sousa Coutinho granted her asylum and instructed his officials to respect her and her position, he did not favor direct intervention in affairs in the eastern part of the Portuguese zone.

Kamana's son and successor did manage to end the division of the country by successfully recovering the capital and being crowned as king of Matamba in around 1810.

== See also ==
- List of Rulers of Matamba
- List of Ngolas of Ndongo
- Nzinga of Ndongo and Matamba
- Category:Matamban and Ndongo monarchs
- History of Angola
- Kingdom of Ndongo
- Kingdom of Kongo
- African military systems to 1800
- African military systems after 1800
