= Imbangala =

Angolan people

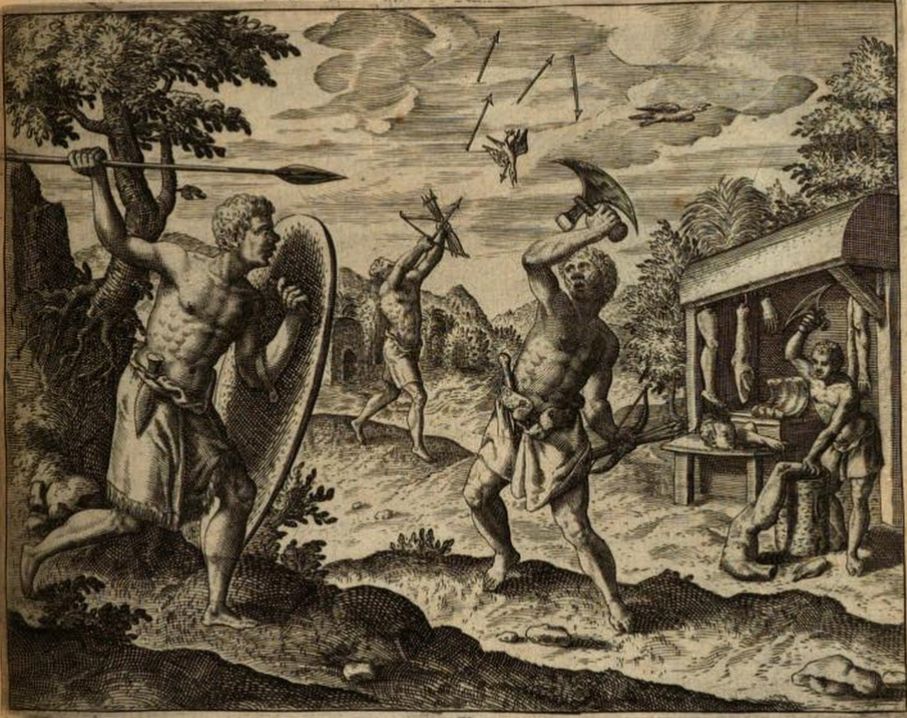
Depiction of the Imbangala by Theodor de Bry.

The Imbangala or Mbangala were groups of warriors and marauders, who worked as hired mercenaries in 17th-century Angola, and later founded the Kasanje Kingdom. They served both the Portuguese Empire and its regional enemies at different periods. The Portuguese valued them as partners in the African slave trade because their reputation as fierce warriors who practised cannibalism helped them subjugate rival groups and supply captives to slave traders.

== Origins ==
The Imbangala were people, possibly from Central Africa, who appeared in Angola during the early 17th century. Their origins are still debated. There is general agreement that they were not the same Jagas that attacked the Kingdom of Kongo during the reign of Alvaro I.

In the 1960s, Jan Vansina and David Birmingham hypothesised that the oral traditions of the Lunda Empire suggested that both groups of Jaga marauders originated in the Lunda Empire (present-day Democratic Republic of the Congo and Zambia) under leader Kinguri and had fled 1550 and 1612. Another theory is that the Imbangala were a local people of southern Angola originating from the Bie Plateau or the coastal regions west of the highlands.

The first witness account of the Imbangala was published by an English sailor named Andrew Battell, who lived among them for 16 months around 1600–1601 in the coastal regions of modern Angola just south of the Kwanza River. Their leaders told Battell that they had come from a place called Elembe and that they had originated from a "page" in its army. Battell's story was published by Samuel Purchas partially in 1614 and fully in 1625.

== Lifestyle and customs ==
Battell went to their country with Portuguese merchants buying their war captives to sell as slaves. At this time the Imbangala were marauders whose primary interest seemed to be pillaging the country, especially to obtain large quantities of palm wine, which they produced by a wasteful method of chopping down trees and tapping their fermented contents over a few months.

The Imbangala did not permit female members to give birth in their kilombo (Portuguese: quilombo), or armed camp. Instead, they replenished their numbers by capturing adolescents and forcing them to serve in their army. This social structure made the Imbangala warbands ideal slavers, as non-male prisoners had little use in their society and as such could be easily sold to the Portuguese.

The Imbangala were a fully militarised society based entirely on initiation rites as opposed to the customary kinship rites of most African ethnic groups. To keep kinship from replacing initiation, all children born inside a kilombo (village) were killed. Women were allowed to leave the kilombo to have their children, but when they returned, the child was not considered an Imbangala until undergoing initiation. In almost Spartan-like program, children were trained daily in group and individual combat.

During training, they wore a collar that could not be removed, even after initiation, until they had killed a man in battle. Aside from infanticide rituals, the Imbangala covered themselves with ointment called maji a samba believed to confer invulnerability as long as the soldier followed strict set of yijila (codes), which required infanticide, cannibalism, and an absolute absence of cowardice. Their reputation as fierce cannibals who practised human sacrifice and ate the flesh of their enemies instilled fear among the attacked populations. In addition to their actual fighting experience, it was this reputation that made them attractive allies for Portuguese governors.

According to Battell, who lived among them for more than a year, they moved every few months to a new place, attacking the inhabitants and killing or enslaving everybody who could not escape in time. He writes that they ate killed enemies as well as their own fighters if they lacked courage: "those that are faint-hearted, and turn their backs to the enemy, are presently condemned and killed for cowards, and their bodies eaten." Boys had to prove their worth by killing an enemy in order to be accepted among the men – those who tried to run away were killed and eaten too. Battell also reports of ritual human sacrifices held before large battles and other major enterprises. During these rituals, captured enemies were killed together with cows, goats, and dogs, and the flesh of all the victims was eaten together.

== Weapons and tactics ==
Imbangala fighting men were known as ngunza (singular: gonzo) and were divided into twelve squadrons, each led by a captain called a musungo. These twelve squadrons were part of a kilombo, a temporarily fortified town surrounded by a wooden palisade. Each kilombo had twelve gates for the twelve squadrons that formed the total fighting force. The Imbangala army took the open field or any battlefield away from their fortifications in a three-prong formation similar to the famous Zulu "bull horn" formation. The Imbangala attacked with a right horn (mutanda), left horn (muya) and vanguard (muta ita) in the centre. Unlike the Zulu, the Imbangala fought with the same weapons as their enemies, including bows, knives and swords. Their primary weapon was the war club or hatchet.

== Relations with Portuguese ==
The military capacity and ruthlessness of the Imbangala appealed to Portuguese colonists in Angola, who had been fought to a standstill in their war against the Angolan kingdom of Ndongo during the first period of colonial rule (1575–1599). Despite professing disgust at Imbangala customs, Portuguese governors of Luanda sometimes hired them for their campaigns, beginning with Bento Banha Cardoso in 1615 but most notably after Luis Mendes de Vasconcelos's 1618 assault on Ndongo. Álvaro II of Kongo objected to the first of these alliances, complaining that the Imbangala "were 'eating' many of his subjects", but the Portuguese ignored him.

Mendes de Vasconcelos operated with three bands of Imbangala but soon found that they were not disciplined enough to serve the Portuguese. Kasanje's band, in particular, broke free of Portuguese control and began a long campaign of pillage that eventually established them in the Baixa de Cassange region of modern Angola along the Kwango River. The band became the modern Angolan ethnicity that calls itself Imbangala (and ceased the militant customs of its predecessors in the late 17th century).

Another band, Kaza, joined Ndongo and opposed the Portuguese before betraying Ndongo's Queen Njinga Mbande in 1629, thus frustrating that queen's attempt to preserve Ndongo's independence from a base on islands in the Kwanza River. After Njinga's short-lived attempt to join with Kasanje in 1629–30, she went to Matamba and there formed her own (or joined with another) Imbangala band led by a man known as Njinga a Mona (Njinga's son). Though reported to be an Imbangala herself (supposedly taking an initiation rite that involved pounding up a baby in a grain mortar), Njinga probably never really became one.

== Later fate ==
Other bands were integrated into the Portuguese army serving as auxiliary soldiers, under their commanders and cantoned within the Portuguese territory. As the 17th century wore on, they and other bands were annihilated by one or another of the political states, such as the one formed by Njinga in Matamba. One rogue group of Imbangala set down roots and formed the Kasanje Kingdom.

South of the Kwanza, in the original homeland of the Imbangala, they continued operating much as before for a least another half a century, but even there, they gradually formed partnerships with existing political entities such as Bihe (Viye), Huambo (Wambu) or Bailundu (Mbailundu). In all these areas, their customs tended to moderate in the 18th century, cannibalism was restricted to ritual and sometimes only to symbolic occasions (for example, in the 19th century, Imbangala groups in the central highlands still practiced a ritual known as "eating the old man").

== See also ==
- History of Angola
- Angolan Wars
- Kulashingo of Kasanje
- Kalunga of Kasanje
- Pascoal of Kasanje
- Imbe Kalandula
- Kabuku ka Ndonga
