= Filips van Zuylen's campaign against Luanda =

1624 Dutch campaign in Portuguese Angola

Dutch campaign against Luanda (1624)
- Part of Dutch–Portuguese War
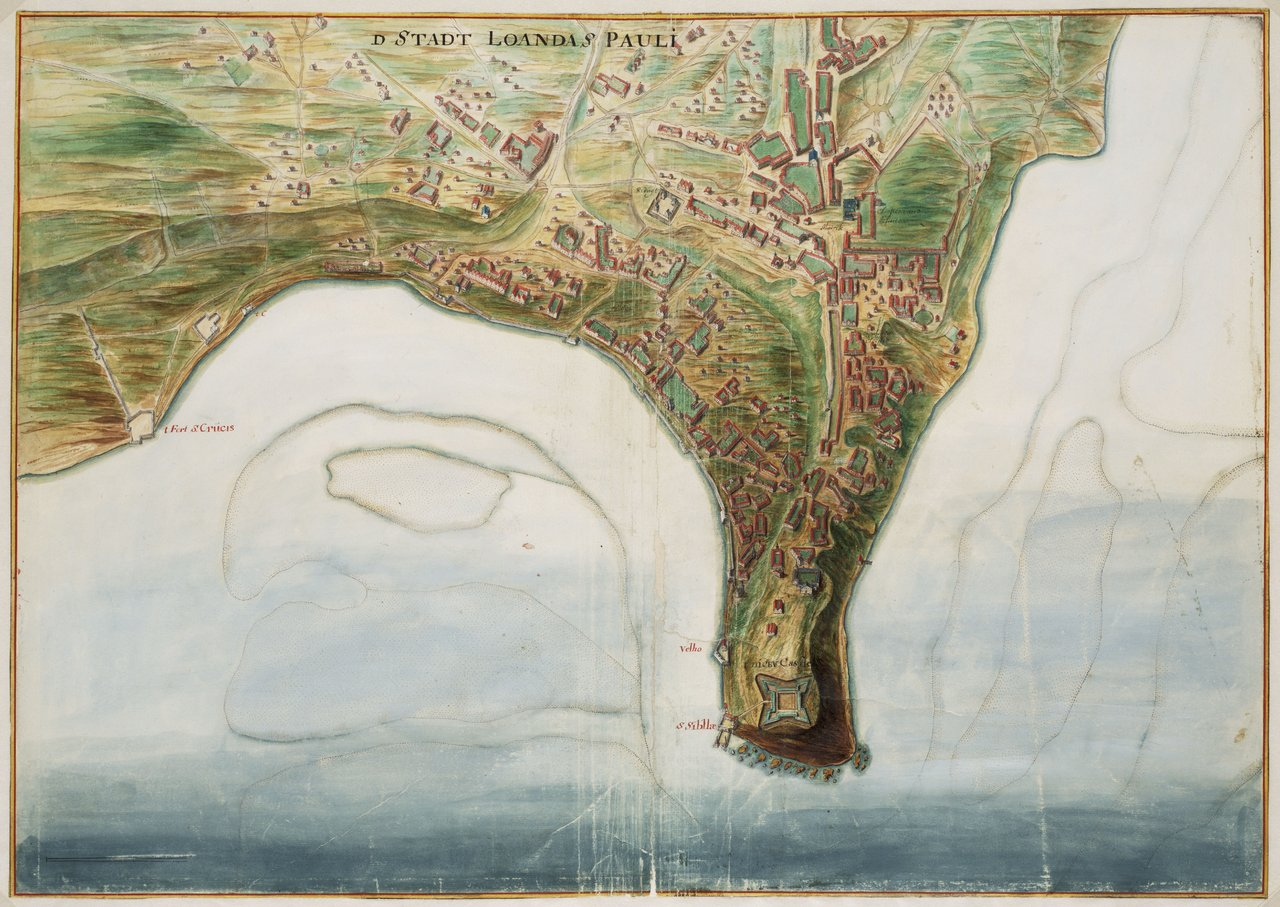
- The city of Luanda by Johannes Vingboons (1665)
Date	June to December 1, 1624
Location	Luanda, Portuguese Angola
Result	Portuguese victory

Belligerents
Dutch West India Company	Kingdom of Portugal

Commanders and leaders
First attack: (Dutch West India Company) Filips van Zuylen; Second attack: (Dutch West India Company) Filips van Zuylen (Dutch West India Company) Piet Hein	First attack: (Portugal) Simão de Mascarenhas (Portugal) Fernão de Sousa; Second attack: (Portugal) Fernão de Sousa

The Filips van Zuylen's campaign against Luanda took place in 1624, it was an episode of the Dutch-Portuguese War that resulted in a heavy defeat for the Dutch West India Company. After two failed attempts to conquer the city, the invading forces would retreat.

== Background ==
Prior to this event, Portugal had been influencing many provinces of the Kingdom of Kongo and by 1617, numerous of duchies and provinces were fighting for independence. King Pedro II of Kongo wanted to remove the Portuguese from his country and decided to request assistance by the Dutch. A Dutch fleet then arrived in Luanda to support the offensive but by then Pedro II had died. Nonetheless, the Dutch still carried out the attack.

== Campaign ==
At the beginning of June, the Dutch attacked Luanda with 4 ships under the command of Filips van Zuylan. The Portuguese Bishop governor, Frei Simão de Mascarenhas, was surprised by the appearance of the Dutch corsairs and hurriedly sent six poorly prepared ships against them, but they retreated ashore without fighting and the crews fled. The Dutch destroyed three ships and the Bishop ordered the remaining three to be burned. However, the Portuguese governor of Angola was substituted by Fernão de Sousa, who was coming from the mainland. After arriving in Luanda, the Dutch retreated, thinking that Fernão was bringing reinforcements. The first attack ultimately failed.

After this initial defeat, Zuylen waited for reinforcements that were coming from Brazil before attempting to attack Luanda again, this time with the help of another corsair, Piet Hein, in October of that same year. The second attempt to conquer the city then began on October 30, but while approaching from the south Hein missed van Zuylen's 3-ship squadron, waiting to the north of Luanda, and went ahead with the attack on his own. Hein's fleet suffered a humiliating defeat as a result. Many of his ships became stuck just outside the Portuguese city and, when other Dutch ships tried to save them, the Portuguese quickly made use of their cannons. Hein then realised that his ships couldn't breach the city's fortifications. Following a failed sortie against some Portuguese merchant ships in the harbor, the Dutch retreated back to friendly ports.

== Aftermath ==
Even though this campaign did not succeed, the Dutch West India Company would not give up on conquering Luanda, and in 1629, it was attacked once again. Finally in 1641, it was captured by the Dutch army, though 7 years later in 1648, it was reconquered by the Portuguese.

== See also ==
- Dutch Loango-Angola
- Recapture of Angola
- Angolan Wars
