= Groot Desseyn =

17th-century Dutch military plan

The Groot Desseyn (Dutch for 'Grand Design') was a plan devised in 1623 by the Dutch West India Company (WIC) to seize the possessions of the Iberian Union (Spain and Portugal) in Africa and the Americas, in order to disrupt the colonial revenue stream the Spanish were using to fund their war against the Netherlands.

== History ==
Under the Iberian Union (1580-1640), Portugal was under the rule of the Spanish Habsburg. Portuguese colonies like Brazil, where the Dutch Republic had gained prominence in as part of the sugar trade, would then later exclude Dutch traders under Spanish policy. After the Twelve Years' Truce ended, the Dutch West India Company (WIC) was founded on 3 June 1621. This company was granted the monopoly on trade in the Atlantic by the States-General of the Dutch Republic. After capital had been raised for the company, the company's directors, the Heeren XIX (WIC board), devised the Groot Desseyn in October 1623.

The plan was to first seize the capital of Brazil, São Salvador da Bahia (Salvador), and then the main Portuguese fort on the coast of Angola, São Paulo de Loanda (Luanda). In this way, the company would control both the lucrative sugar plantations in Brazil and the Atlantic slave trade. Control of the trade itself was necessary because of the high mortality rate from the plantations' harsh conditions and tropical diseases such as malaria.

=== First attempt (1624–1625) ===
A fleet was swiftly assembled to capture Salvador. In December 1623 and January 1624, the fleet left the Republic in two groups, which were assembled in the Cape Verde islands. Under Jacob Willekens, the force captured Salvador on 8 May 1624.

The Dutch in Salvador then assembled a force to attack Luanda. Under Piet Hein, the fleet tried to capture the city but failed, because Filips van Zuylen had tried to capture the city a few months earlier as well and prompted the Portuguese to fortify and add reinforcements.

In Brazil, however, the Dutch were more successful. Despite already being anticipated by the Spanish-Portuguese Empire, the Dutch siege succeeded when 1,000 Dutchmen surrounded the fort and caused most of its defenders to flee. When the Spanish Crown heard of the sudden loss, a fleet with 12,000 men was assembled to recapture the city. They succeeded after a long siege, capturing the fort in May 1625 - one whole year after the fort had previously been taken. After the capture of Elmina on the Gold Coast of Africa failed, the Groot Desseyn was temporarily abandoned.

The Dutch would still succeed in their original Groot Desseyn attempt in 1637 by conquering both the previous two targets and much of the nearby lands; the rich West African (Dutch) Gold Coast and Brazilian New Holland included. Although conflict with the native peoples continued, Spain would decisively drop its claims at the end of the Eighty Years' War.

=== Second attempt (1630–1650) ===
Things changed for the better for the company when Piet Hein captured the Spanish treasure fleet in 1628. The company was suddenly flush with resources and set out to try once again to capture the Portuguese Atlantic colonies.

The slave port of Gorée in Senegambia had already been seized in 1627. A fleet under the leadership of Hendrick Lonck then managed to capture Recife and Olinda in early 1630. A separate group took Arguin in 1633; in 1637, Elmina also fell.

Two attempts to recapture Salvador failed, however. In 1641, a fleet under the leadership of Cornelis Jol finally managed to capture Luanda. The WIC was now at the height of its power, and the Groot Desseyn seemed to have more or less succeeded.

The tide soon began to turn, however. In 1645, the Dutch lost the Battle of Tabocas on the Brazilian mainland, which would prove the first of many defeats in Brazil. Meanwhile, the cost of constant warfare brought the company at the brink of bankruptcy. In 1647, at the end of its charter, the company was recapitalized with 1.5 million Dutch guilders from the Dutch East India Company (VOC) and the Dutch Republic took over the war effort in Brazil. Luanda was recaptured by Portugal in 1648, and two Battles of Guararapes, the first in 1648 and the second in 1649, effectively ended Dutch involvement in Brazil. Between 1652 and 1654, the Dutch tried to recapture Recife, to no avail. The Groot Desseyn had failed.

=== Caribbean ===
From about 1623 until 1641 or later, the Dutch regularly sent fleets into the Caribbean. They captured ships and inteferred with trade but rarely took territory. Their greatest achievement was Piet Hein's capture of the Spanish silver fleet in 1628.

== See also ==
- Dutch–Portuguese War
