= Fort Nossa Senhora da Vitória =

- Fortaleza de Nossa Senhora da Vitória
- Massangano in Angola
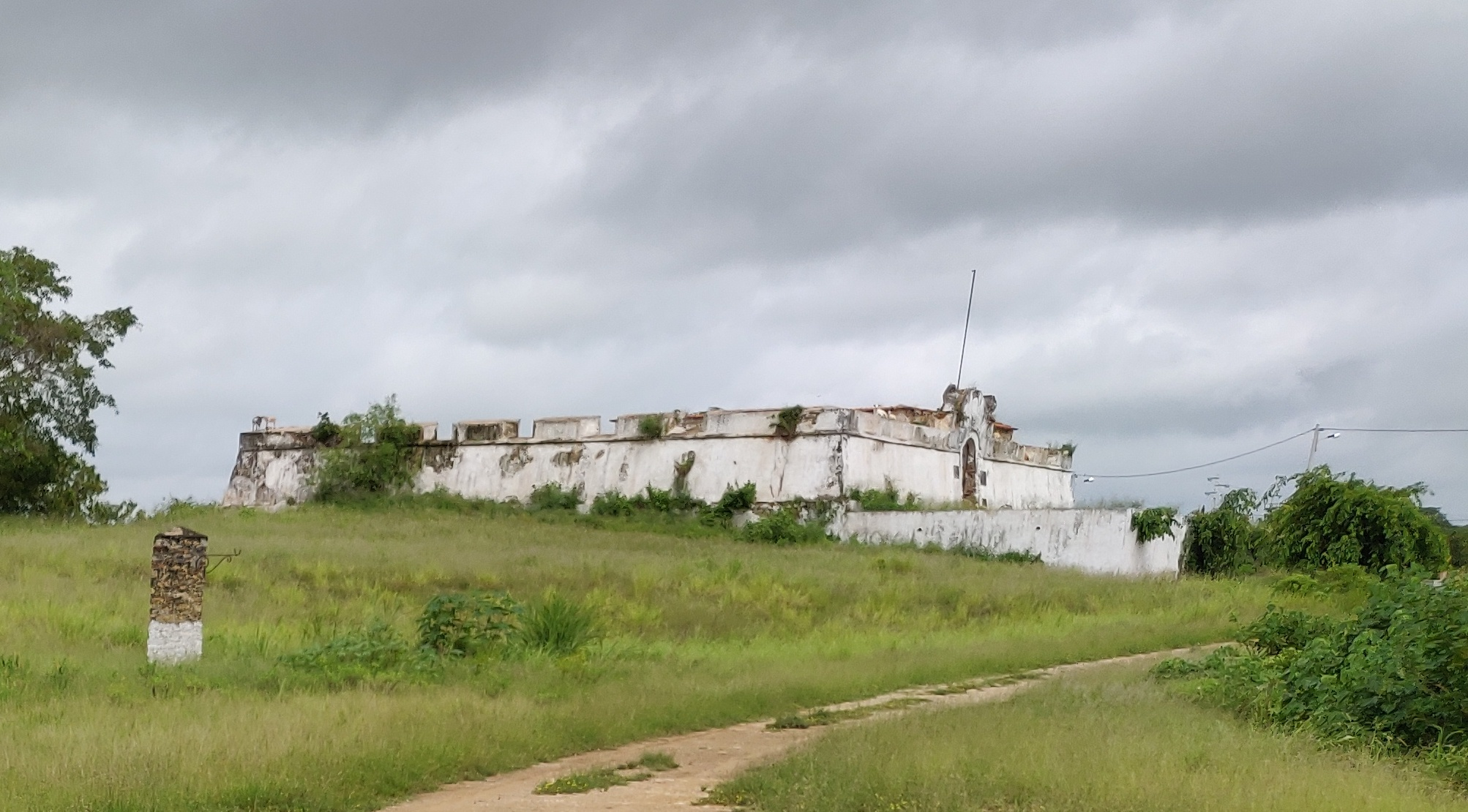

Site information
- Controlled by: Portuguese Empire; Angola
- Condition: Abandoned

Location
- Coordinates: 9°37′46″S 14°15′23″E

Site history
- Built: 1583

The Fort Nossa Senhora da Vitória de Massangano, popularly known as Fortress of Massangano (Fortaleza de Massangano) is located in the village-commune of Massangano, in the municipality of Cambambe, in the province of Cuanza-Norte, in Angola.

== History ==
In this place, in 1580, the Battle of Massangano took place, in which the Portuguese forces defeated those of King Quiluange of the Kingdom of Dongo.

Later, in 1582, Portuguese forces, under the command of captain Paulo Dias de Novais, were repelled by Dongo, when they tried to penetrate the region, in search of the legendary silver mines.

This fortification was built by Novais himself or by Manuel Cerveira Pereira, according to other authors, on the banks of the Cuanza River, in 1583, with the function of extending and ensuring the Portuguese occupation in the region. In addition to marking the Portuguese military presence, this establishment guaranteed the integrity of commercial networks, including the slave trade to the American continent.

Later, in 1640, the forces of Queen Ana de Sousa Ginga attacked the Massangano Fort, but her two sisters Cambu and Fungi were imprisoned on the occasion, the latter being executed. Faced with the occupation of Luanda by the forces of the Dutch West India Company, in August 1641, it was to Massangano that the Portuguese retreated and where they resisted until the reconquest of Luanda by Salvador Correia de Sá e Benevides, in August 1648.

In Massangano, José Álvares Maciel, involved in the Inconfidência Mineira, in the 1790s, was also detained, being released there to fight for his own survival.

Until the mid-19th century, the prison and its garrison were governed by a captain-major. In 1825 governor Feo Torres reported that the population of Vila da Vitória (Massangano) was 10910 inhabitants. In 1885 it was 13500. In 1854 the town had about 600 homes and the fortress garrison numbered 12 guns and a light company of 70 men, though it had formerly consisted of two companies of militia and one of native levy.

Some buildings and the ruins of Massangano were classified as a National Monument by Provincial Decree n° 81, of April 28, 1923. They are currently in the hands of the State, assigned to the Ministry of Culture.

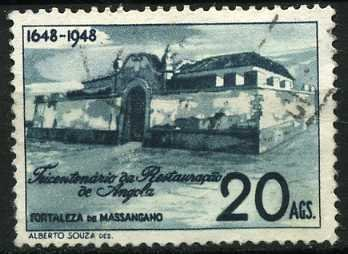
1948 Portuguese stamp featuring the Fort of Massangano

== Features ==
The fort has a square plan, without bulwarks at the edges. In its walls ten gun emplacements are visible. It is accessed by a vaulted tunnel from the gate-of-arms, on the landward side. On its embankment stand the service buildings: Casa do Comando (Command House) and Quartel de Tropa (Barracks).

By the ramp that provides access to the fort, a stone inscription reads:

First fortress / 1604 / National / Monument.

The gateway is sided by two bronze plaques which read:

Visit of the Head of State General Francisco Higino Craveiro Lopes in evocation and homage to the heroes of the resistance and liberation of Angola. In June 28 1954.

and

On August 18 of the year 300 of the Restoration of Angola, the Governor José Agapito da Silva Carvalho, the representatives of the war army and navy, of the descendants of Salvador Correia and all the social classes of the population gathered here, affirming their homage to the memory of those who so heroically resisted in this bulwark to the Dutch invasion, allowing for the definite integration of Angola in the sovereignty of Portugal. The G. C. F. L. August 1948.

== See also ==
- Portuguese Angola
- Dutch Loango-Angola
- Angolan Wars
