= South Atlantic campaign (1647–1649) =

- Part of Dutch–Portuguese War
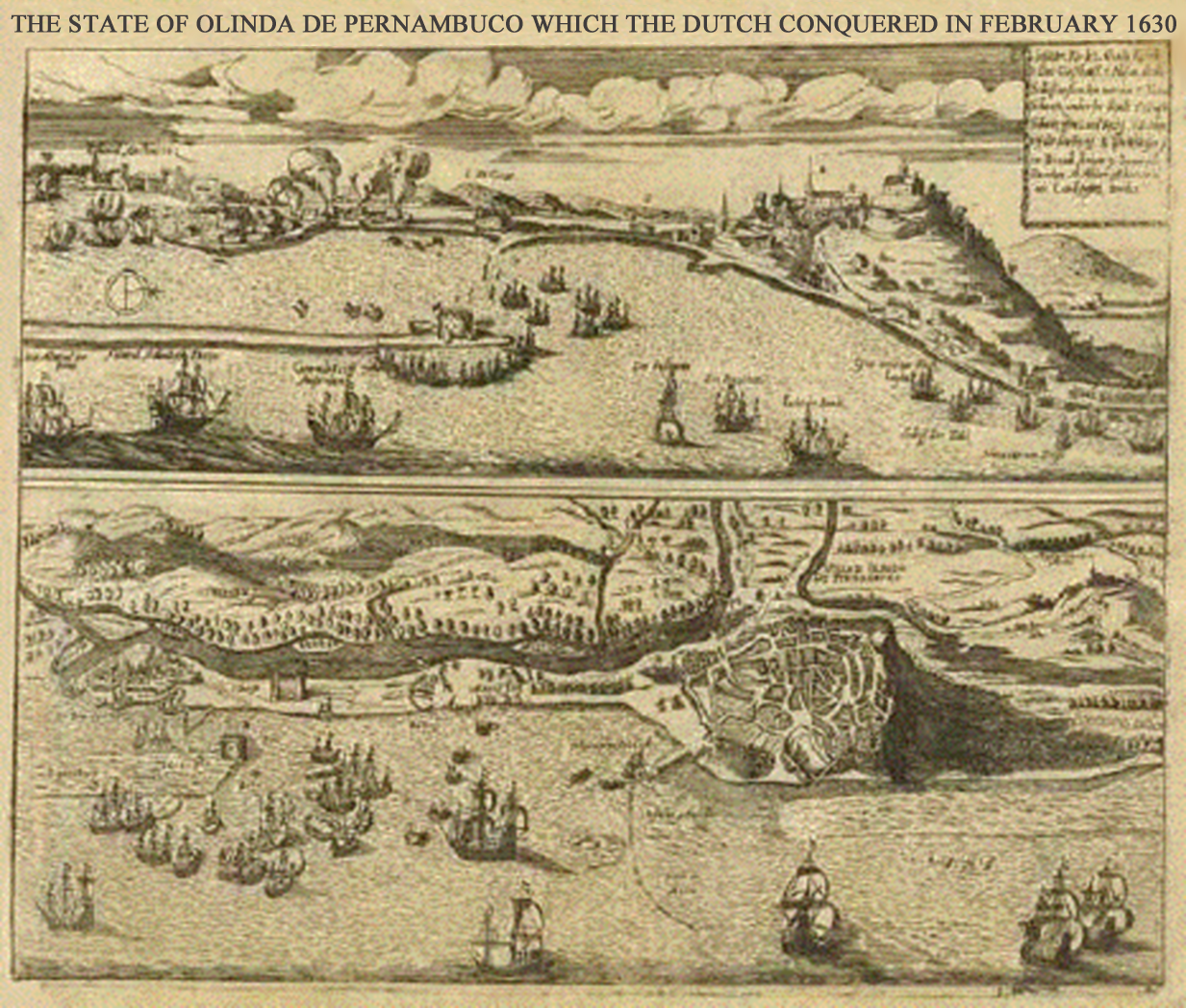
- German map of Dutch Olinda in Brasil, c. 1650
Date	February 1647 – June 1649
Location	South Atlantic Ocean
Result	Portuguese victory
Territorial changes	Portuguese reconquest of Luanda and São Tomé

Belligerents
Portugal	VOC (Dutch West India Company) WIC; Ndongo; Matamba

Commanders and leaders
(Portugal) António Teles de Meneses (Portugal) Salvador de Sá	Unknown

The South Atlantic campaign (1647–1649) was a military naval campaign fought between the Kingdom of Portugal and the Dutch Republic in the South Atlantic Ocean, during the Dutch–Portuguese War.
