= Dutch Loango-Angola =

17th-century Dutch territorial possession in Angola

Coordinates: 8°S 13°E

Governorate Loango-Angola Loango-Angola
- 1641–1648
- Flag Coat of arms

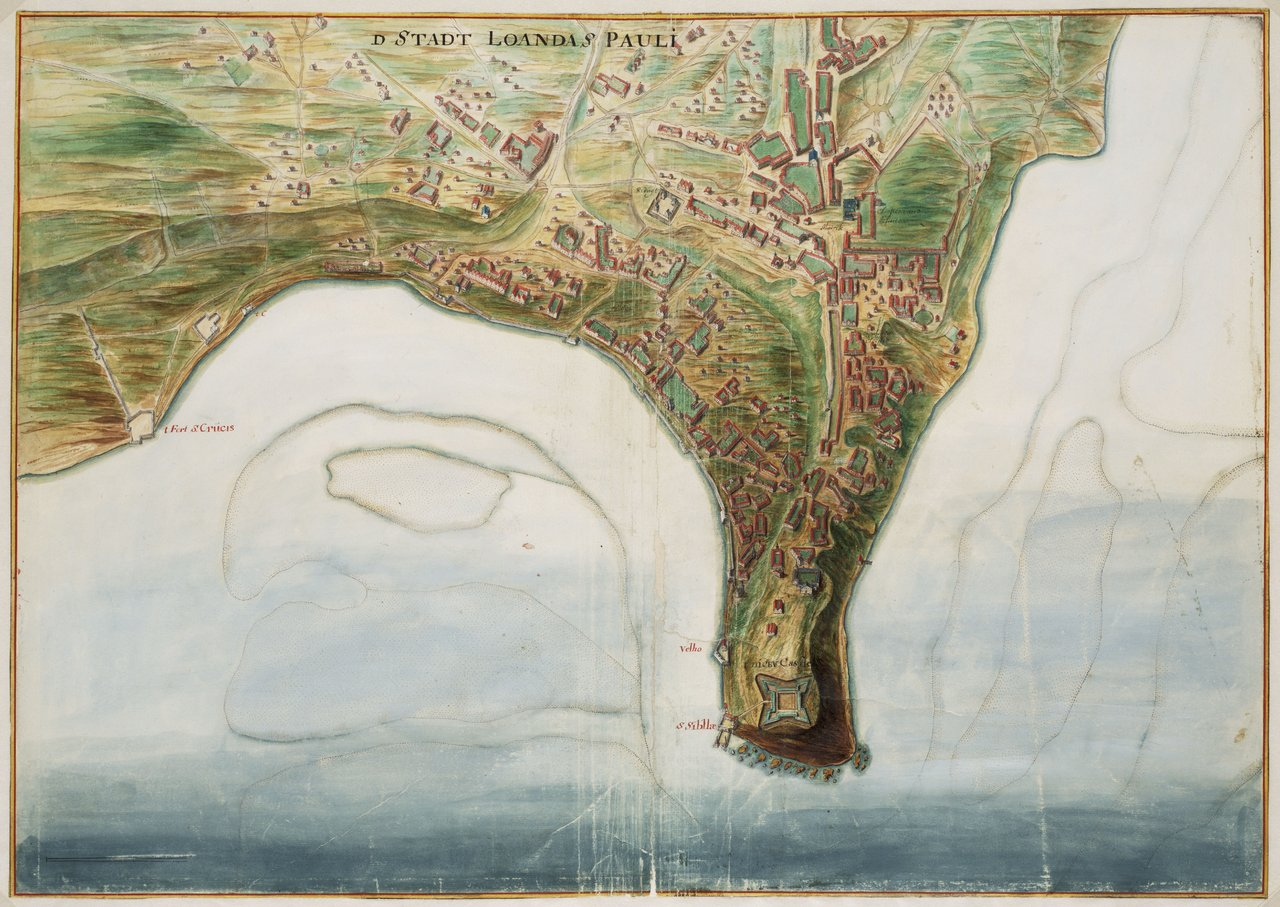
- The city of Luanda by Johannes Vingboons (1665)
- Status: Dutch colony
- Capital: Fort Aardenburgh
- Common languages: Dutch (official); Kongo, Chokwe, Umbundu, Kimbundu, Ngangela, Kwanyama
- Religion: Dutch Reformed; Traditional African religions
- Director
  - 1641–1643: Pieter Moorthamer and Cornelis Nieulant
  - 1643–1645: Hans Mols
  - 1644-1647: Heynderick van Redinckhoven
  - 1645–1648: Cornelis Hendrikszoon Ouwman
- History
  - Capture of Luanda: 26 August 1641
  - Recapture of Luanda: 21 August 1648
- Currency: Dutch guilder
| Preceded by | Succeeded by |
| Portuguese Angola | Portuguese Angola |
- Today part of: Angola; Republic of the Congo

Loango-Angola is the name for the possessions of the Dutch West India Company (WIC) in contemporary Angola and the Republic of the Congo. Notably, the name refers to the colony that was captured from the Portuguese between 1641 and 1648. Due to the distance between Luanda and Elmina, the capital of the Dutch Gold Coast, a separate administration for the southern districts of Africa was established at Luanda during the period of the Dutch occupation.

After Angola was recaptured by the Portuguese in 1648, Dutch trade with Loango-Angola did not stop, however. From about 1670 onward, the WIC acquired slaves from the Loango region on a regular basis, and Dutch free traders continued this practice until after 1730.

== History ==
Dutch traders began trading with Loango-Angola in the early 17th century, driven south by increasing competition on the Gold Coast. African traders were generally welcoming of the Dutch, who provided goods the Portuguese were not able to provide. Among other things, the Dutch traded redwood in Mayumba, and ivory and copper in Loango. Initially, the Dutch maintained the port city of Mpinda at the mouth of the Congo River as the southernmost border of their operations.

=== Early attempts (1624) ===
As part of the Groot Desseyn ('Grand Design') plan, the Dutch West India Company (WIC), which had been founded in 1621, tried to capture Luanda after they had captured Salvador da Bahia, the capital of Brazil. Under the leadership of Piet Hein, a Dutch fleet tried to capture Luanda in 1624, but failed, because Filips van Zuylen had tried to capture the city a few months earlier as well, leading the Portuguese to build reinforcements.

After Piet Hein captured the Spanish treasure fleet in 1628, the WIC once again tried to set the Groot Desseyn plan in motion. With plenty of resources to pay for their military expenditure, the Dutch successfully captured Recife and Olinda, the core region of Brazilian sugar cane plantations, in early 1630.

=== Capture of Luanda (1641) ===
In 1641, a Dutch fleet under the command of Cornelis Jol, seized Luanda from the Portuguese. On 25 August 1641, the Dutch landed 2,145 troops near Luanda under the command of Jol. Upon the Dutch arrival, 800 Portuguese, some soldiers and some civilians, fled and regrouped at Kilunda. On 19 September, the Dutch drove them from that position and forced them to fall back to the Portuguese plantations along the Bengo River. The Dutch then fortified their positions along the river.

Dutch forces took control of Luanda and signed a treaty with Queen Nzinga of the Ndongo Kingdom. Nzinga unsuccessfully attacked the Portuguese at Fort Massangano. She recruited new fighters and prepared to engage the Portuguese in battle again, but Salvador Correia de Sá led Portuguese forces from Brazil in expelling the Dutch and reasserting control in Angola. Nzinga's forces retreated to Matamba again.

=== Dutch rule ===
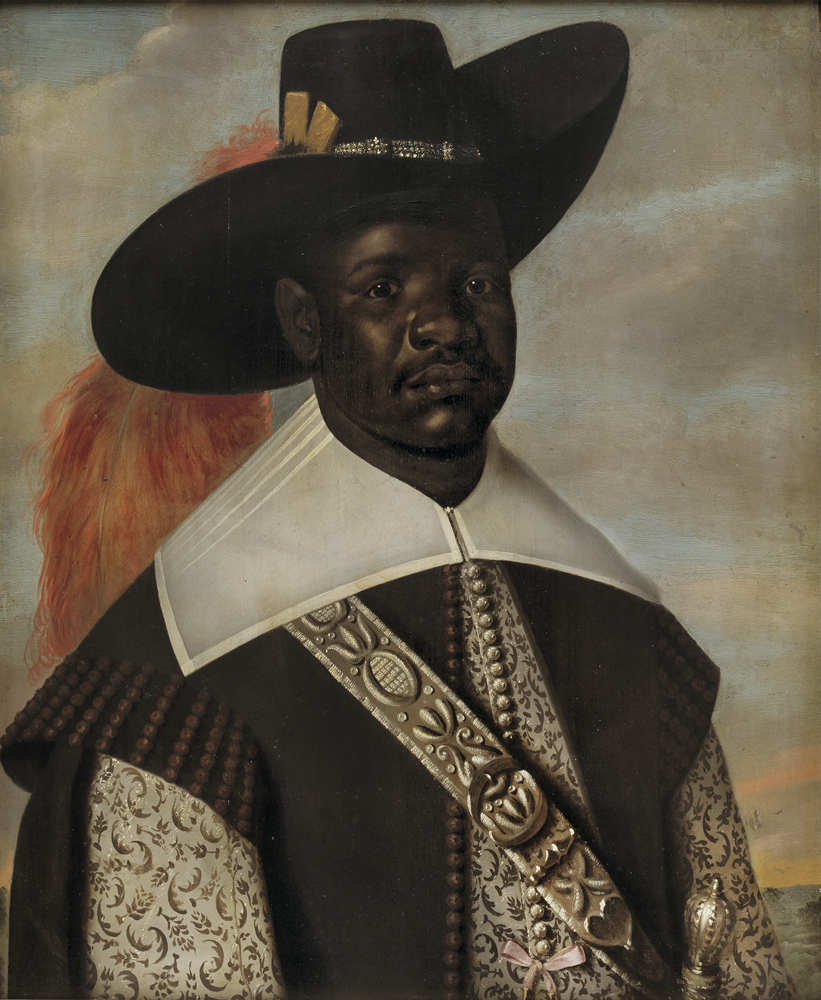
A portrait of emissary Dom Miguel de Castro, cousin of the Count of Sonho, whilst in the Dutch Republic in 1643.

The Dutch ruled Angola from 26 August 1641 to 21/24 August 1648, occupying the coastal areas (under a WIC governor of Angola. This attack was the culmination of a plan first proposed by Kongo's King Pedro II in 1622. After the Dutch fleet under Admiral Cornelis Jol took Luanda, the Portuguese withdrew to the Bengo River, but following the renewal of the Kongo-Dutch alliance, Bengo was attacked and subsequently Portuguese forces withdrew to Massangano.

In 1643, the Count of Sonho sent a mission to the Dutch Republic, headed by his cousin Dom Miguel de Castro. The mission travelled via Dutch Brazil, where they were received by John Maurice of Nassau, and arrived in Vlissingen on 19 June 1643. De Castro sailed by yacht to The Hague on 2 July 1643, where he had an audience with Stadtholder Frederick Henry.

The Dutch were not interested in conquering Angola, much to the chagrin of the African Monarchs Garcia II and Njinga, who had both pressed them to assist in driving the Portuguese from the colony. However, Dutch authorities came to realise that they could not monopolise the slave trade from Angola just by holding Luanda and a few nearby places, and moreover, the Portuguese sent several relief expeditions to Massangano from Brazil. Consequently, in 1647, they agreed to reinforce Njinga's army following her defeat by Portuguese forces in 1646. At the Battle of Kombi, Dutch and Njinga's armies crushed a Portuguese army, and in its aftermath laid siege to Ambaca, Massangano, and Muxima.

In 1648, Luanda was recaptured by the Portuguese.

== Administration ==
Capture of Luanda
- Part of Dutch–Portuguese War
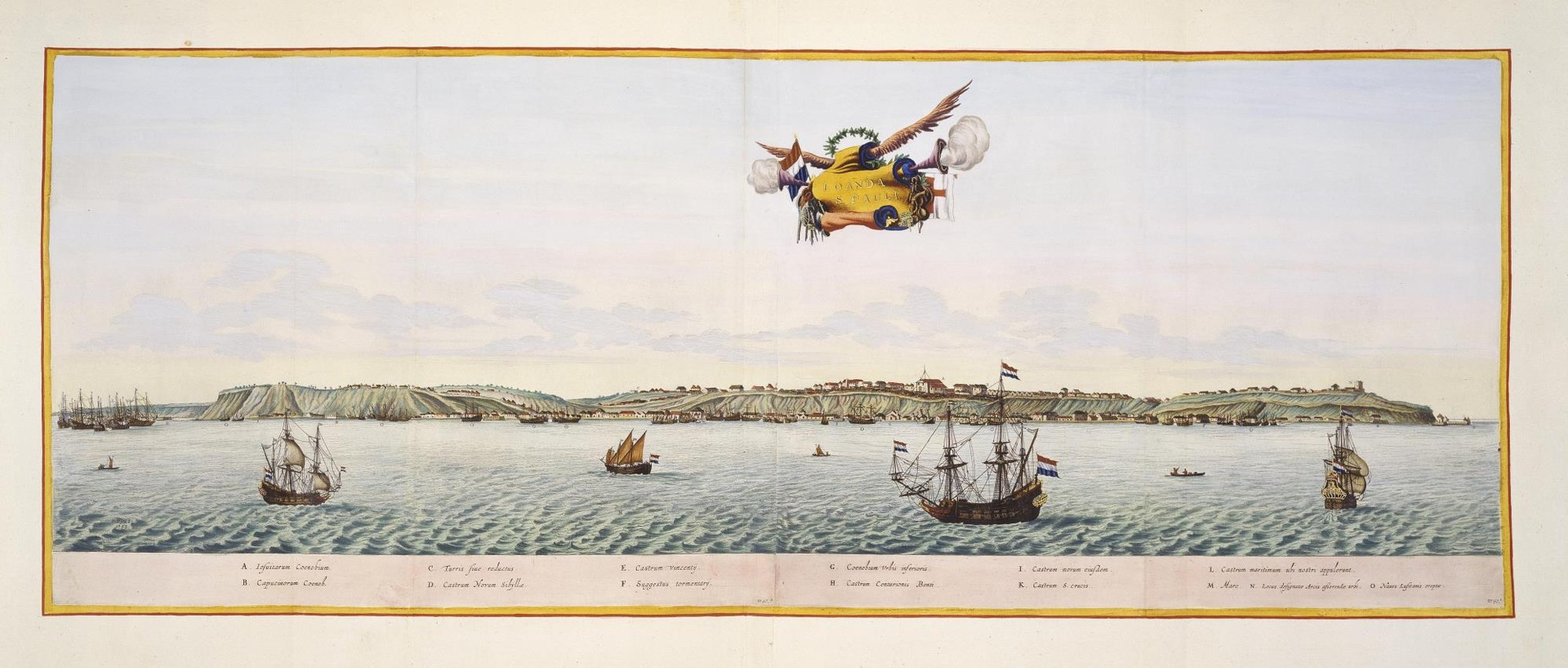
- Capture of Luanda by Cornelis Jol of the Dutch West India Company in 1641
| Date | 1641 |
| Location | Luanda, Portuguese Angola |
| Result | Dutch victory |

Belligerents
| Dutch West India Company | (Portugal) Portuguese Empire |

Commanders and leaders
| (Dutch West India Company) Cornelis Jol | (Portugal) Pedro César de Meneses |

Strength
| 2,145 soldiers 20 ships | Unknown |

According to the instructions of John Maurice, Pieter Moorthamer, and Cornelis Nieulant, who sailed with Jol's fleet, were to assume command of the civil administration once Luanda had fallen into Dutch hands. Moorthamer and Nieulant, both lawyers with a degree from Leiden University, had been members of the colonial council in Dutch Brazil, the former sent out by the Zeeland chamber and the latter by the Amsterdam chamber of the WIC. They assumed civil command on 29 August 1641.

John Maurice had pleaded with the WIC to put Luanda under his administration, but the WIC eventually decided to make Loango-Angola, including São Tomé, a separate commandment. They decided that a triumvirate of three directors consisting of Moorthamer, Nieulant, and Hans Mols would rule the colony, the latter of whom was to be dispatched from the Dutch Republic. Mols had been commandant of Cape Verde and Gorée between 1632 and 1635 and chief factor in Elmina, and enjoyed a great reputation as a merchant.

When Mols arrived in Luanda on 12 April 1643, Pieter Moorthamer had just left for Brazil. Nieulant died shortly after, on 19 June 1643. This left Mols, who had little experience in Luanda, in command by himself. Mols had difficulty gaining control, with troops even disobeying his orders. The WIC valued Mols' skills as a merchant, however, and was wary to let him go. Halfway 1644, Heynderick van Redinckhoven, who was appointed to fill up one of the directorship vacancies, arrived in Luanda to join Mols as head of the colony. Mols eventually left for Brazil on 26 January 1645, leaving only Van Redinckhoven in charge. By that time, Van Redinckhoven had already asked the company directors to be retired to the Dutch Republic. The WIC denied this request, but appointed former envoy Cornelis Hendrikszoon Ouwman as co-director on 6 July 1645, to relieve Van Redinckhoven of some of his tasks. Van Redinckhoven left Luanda in April 1647, leaving only Ouwman in charge.

== See also ==
- Colonial history of Angola
- Angolan Wars
