= Filips van Zuylen =

Dutch corsair

- Piratical career
- Type: Dutch corsair
- Allegiance: The Netherlands
- Years active: 1620s
- Rank: Admiral
- Battles: Filips van Zuylen's campaign against Luanda

Filips van Zuylen was a Dutch corsair active in the 1620s. As part of the Groot Desseyn plan, he was particularly active against the Portuguese in West Africa but failed to capture the colony of Luanda, an important center for the Atlantic slave trade, in early 1624. After this initial defeat he decided to wait for reinforcements from Brazil before making a second attempt, this time with fellow corsair Piet Heyn, in October of that same year. While approaching from the south Heyn missed van Zuylen's 3-ship squadron, waiting to the north of Loanda, and decided to go ahead with the attack on his own. Heyn's fleet suffered a disastrous defeat as a result. Many of his ships became stuck in the shallows just outside Loanda and, when other ships stopped to free them, made easy targets for the Portuguese cannons. Heyn quickly realized that his seven ships could not breach the colony's heavily defended fortifications. Following a failed nighttime sortie against Portuguese merchant ships moored in the harbor, he ordered a withdrawal and the Dutch corsair fleet retreated back to friendly ports. In 1641, another Dutch corsair, named Cornelis Jol, succeeded in capturing Luanda after a brutal battle. Nevertheless, the colony did not last long under Dutch rule, as it was recaptured by the Portuguese in 1643.
