= Recapture of Angola =

Portuguese siege on Dutch-controlled Luanda

- Part of Dutch–Portuguese War
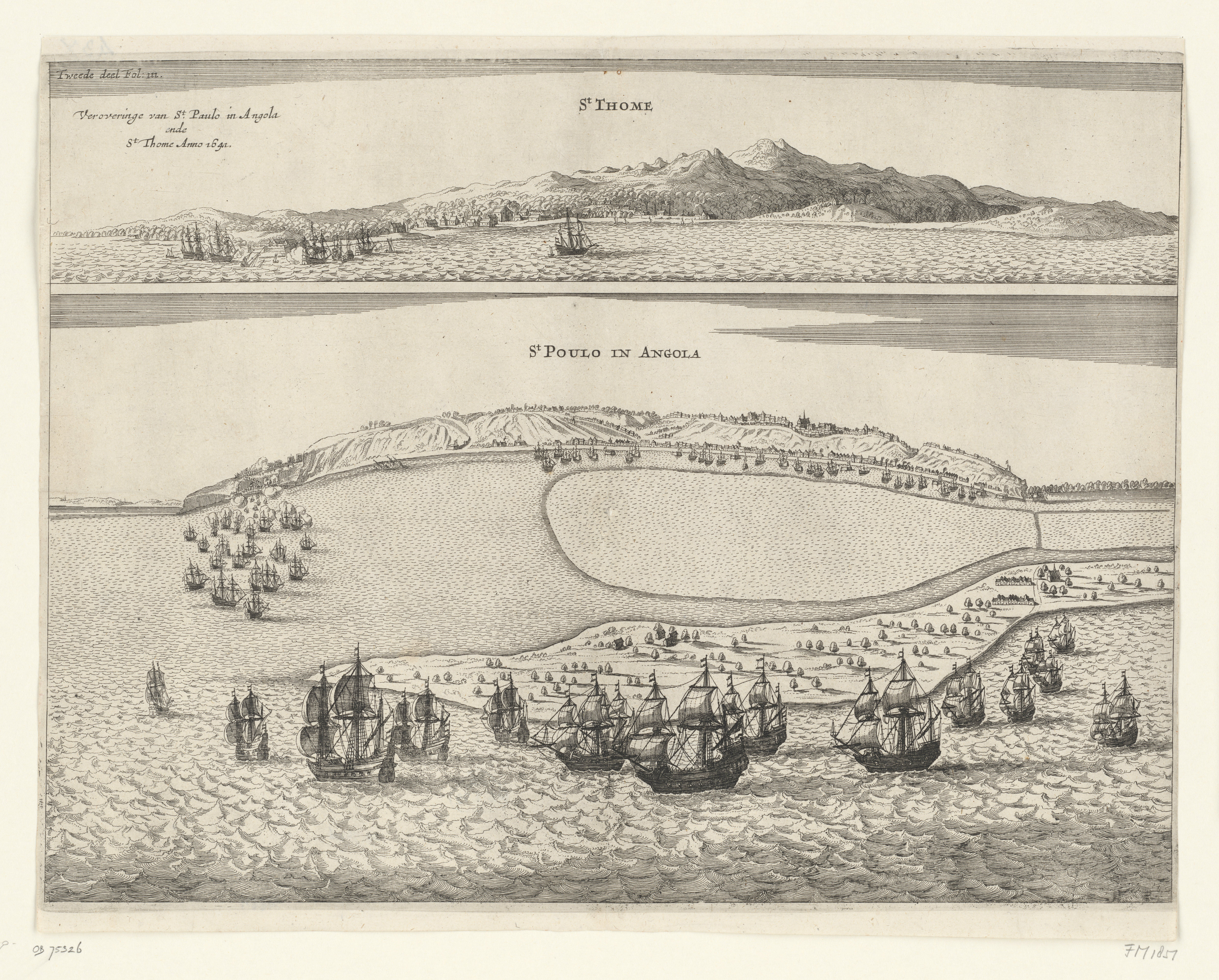
Date	1648
Location	Luanda, Benguela, São Tomé and Príncipe
Result	Portuguese victory
Territorial changes	Disestablishment of Dutch Loango-Angola

Belligerents
(Portugal) Portuguese Empire	Dutch West India Company; Ndongo; Matamba

Commanders and leaders
(Portugal) Salvador de Sá	Unknown

Strength
900 men	1,200 Dutch; Unknown number of natives

Casualties and losses
163 men killed 160 men wounded	Dutch at least 150 men killed at least 300 men captured Unknown number of men wounded Natives; Unknown

The Recapture of Angola, or Reconquest of Angola, was a military campaign fought between the Portuguese and the Dutch occupiers of Angola. Its most important episode was the siege imposed by the Portuguese on the larger Dutch garrison of Luanda.

In 1641 Johan Maurits sent an expedition under Admiral Cornelis Jol from Recife in Dutch Brazil to seize the Angolan capital of Luanda. The Dutch were able to easily capture Luanda in August as the Portuguese forces were occupied inland in a campaign against the Kingdom of Kongo. The two countries fought to a stalemate over Angola, until in 1648 the governor of Rio de Janeiro and Angola, Salvador de Sá, with a Brazilian Portuguese fleet from Rio de Janeiro reached Luanda and finding the city defended by 1200 Dutch troops, besieged them and regained it for Portugal exactly seven years after its loss. When a Dutch force of 300 soldiers returned from the interior to help their garrison of Luanda, they also surrendered to the Portuguese, but their allied warriors of Queen Ndjinga fought a battle against the Portuguese and were defeated as well. Then Salvador Correia de Sa sent a force to Benguela where the Dutch garrison surrendered.

He also sent a fleet which recaptured the archipelago of São Tomé e Príncipe from the Dutch, who left behind their artillery.

This was a decisive Dutch defeat since Dutch Brazil couldn't survive without the slaves from Angola. The end of Dutch presence in South America (with the exception of the Guiana) meant not only the bankruptcy of the WIC, but also the end of most of the West Dutch empire.

== See also ==
- Angolan Wars
