= Senegambia (Dutch West India Company) =

Trading posts owned by the Dutch West India Company in the region of Senegal

Senegambia Bovenkust
- 1617–1678
- Flag Coat of arms

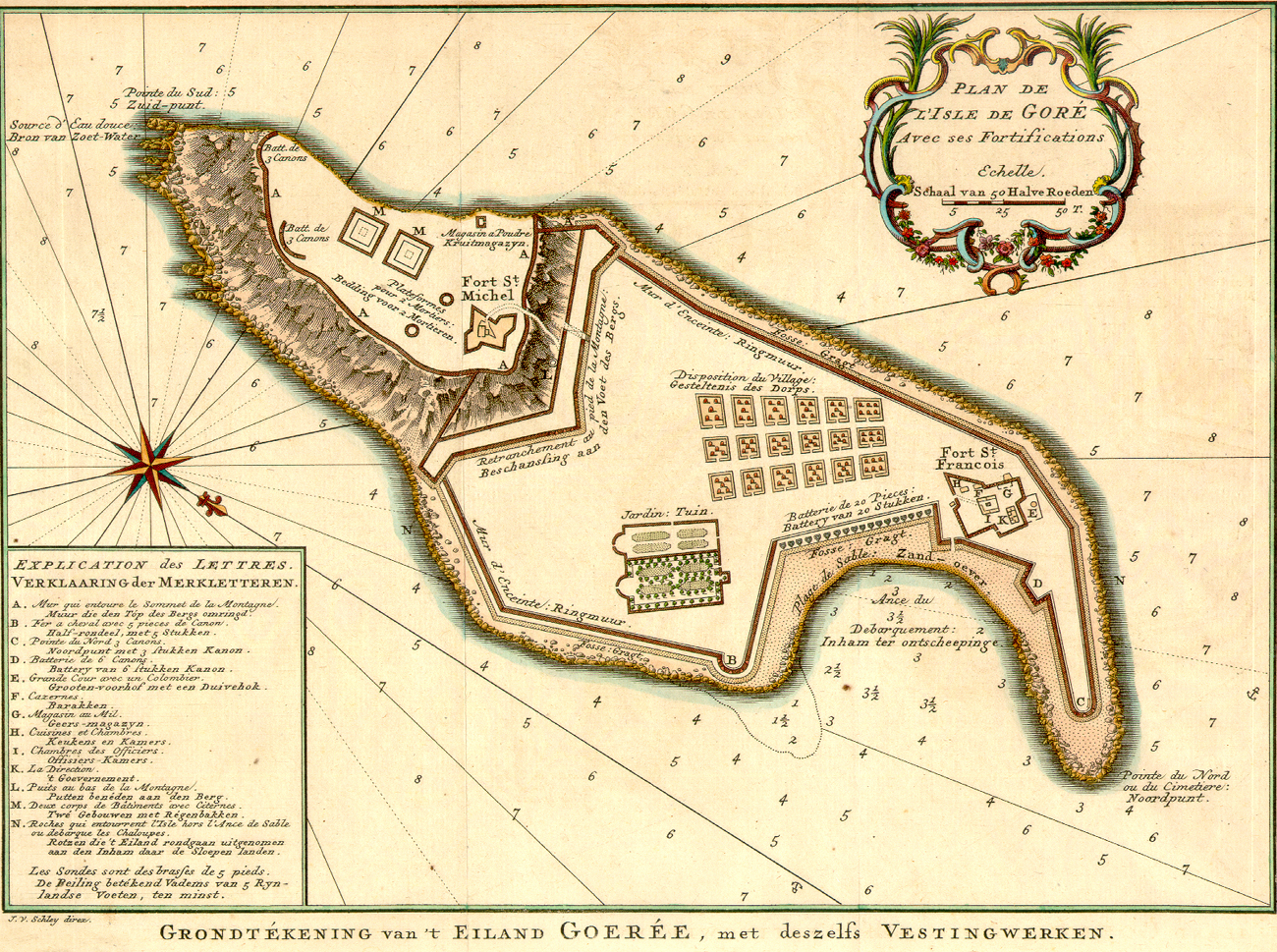
- Scheme of the fortifications on Gorée in 1772 by Jacobus van der Schley
- Status: Dutch colony
- Capital: Gorée
- Common languages: Dutch
- Religion: Dutch Reformed
- Chief factor
  - 1627: Pompeius de la Sale
  - 1675-1677: Pieter Hoppesack
- History
  - Established: 1617
  - Disestablished: 1678
Succeeded by
French West India Company

Senegambia, also known in Dutch as Bovenkust ("Upper Coast"), was the collective noun for the fortifications and trading posts owned by the Dutch West India Company (DWIC) in the region now known as Senegal. The main purpose of these trading posts was to obtain slaves in order to ship them to the Americas.

== History ==
Being almost devoid of drinking water, Gorée was not settled before the arrival of Europeans, although the presence of domesticated sheep noted by Portuguese explorers indicates the island was frequented by local peoples of the nearby mainland. Portuguese traders established themselves on the island in 1444. By the end of the 16th century, Portuguese and Dutch traders were established at Joal and Saly on the mainland as well.

Due to the destruction of much of the archive of the First Dutch West India Company, it is unknown when and how the Dutch replaced the Portuguese on Goree. According to Olfert Dapper, the island was gifted to the Dutch West India Company by the local chief Biram in 1617. This statement is problematic, not the least because the Dutch West India Company was only established in 1621. From 1621 to 1637, the WIC exercised a monopoly over Dutch trade in West Africa, pushing the earlier merchants out or underground.

Possession of Goree was the key to accessing the trade of the entire coast south of the Cap Vert, including that of the Gambia River, as it served as a warehousing and transshipment point. In addition, it was a convenient stopover on the shortest route from Europe to the Caribbean. The island was attacked by the Portuguese in early 1629, but they were not able to hold it and their access to the lucrative coastal trade was cut off. From the 1620s to the 1670s, the Dutch West India Company dominated all the trade in the area, including shipping slaves out of the Portuguese post at Cacheu to Curacao. By the 1630s they had created several fortified trading posts on the mainland.

Repeated wars weakened the Dutch West India Company, however, and the Third Anglo-Dutch War precipitated the bankruptcy of the company in 1674. In 1677 a French fleet led by Jean d'Estrées defeated the Dutch and captured Goree and their coastal trading posts. The new administration attempted to create a monopoly, in contrast to the relatively free hand of the Dutch, and trade in the region dropped significantly.

Having lost almost all the trade in gum arabic, bezoar stone, ambergris and ostrich feathers, the DWIC wanted to regain its position. The Frenchman Jean du Casse, head of the Compagnie de Sénégal, reached an agreement with the local leaders, who decided to destroy the Dutch trading posts and the DWIC lost its position for good.

== Administration ==
The trading posts in the Cape Vert region were managed by the Chamber of Amsterdam, a subdivision of the DWIC. The administration at Goerée was headed by a chief factor (Dutch: commies en opperhoofd), and included two to three sub-factors, and three to four assistants. An incomplete list of chief factors was compiled by Guy Thilmans.

Name	Appointed	Took office	Left office	Notes
Pompeius de la Sale	22 July 1627	?	?	Later General on the Gold Coast
Hans Mols	?	1632	1636	Later director of Dutch Loango-Angola
Johannes l'Hermite	7 February 1659	?	?	
Pieter Vlasvat	19 May 1661	?	?	
Pedro Justo Baack	?	1661	1662	
Adrianus Romanus	18 August 1662	?	?	
Johannes Cellarius	?	1664	1667	
Abraham van Asperen	15 July 1667	?	1669	
Pieter Stolwijck	?	1669	1671	
Pieter van Asperen	9 October 1671	?	1673	Died in office
Joachim Eylkens	?	1674	21 March 1674	Died in office
Pieter Hoppesack	?	21 March 1674	1674	
Nicolaas Bruyningh Wildelant	?	1674	1675	
Pieter Hoppesack	?	1675	November 1677	Surrendered to Jean d'Estrées, Count of Estrées

== Senegambia possessions of the DWIC ==
- Gorée: 1617 to 1663 and 1664 to 1677.
  - on Goreé were two fortifications: Fort Nassau (near Fort St. Francois) to the north part of the island and Fort Orange (near Fort St. Michel) on the south end of the island.

Trading posts:

- Portudal: 1633 to 1678. Here the DWIC bought slaves and ivory.
- Rufisque: 1633 to 1678.
- Joal: 1633 to 1678.
