= Salvador de Sá =

Portuguese admiral and crown administrator

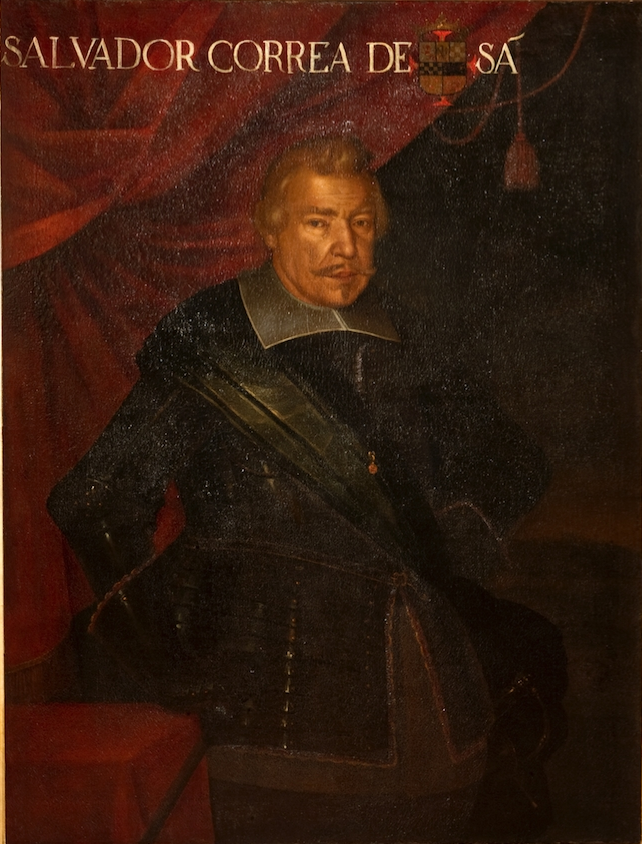
- Portrait by Feliciano de Almeida, c. 1673–75
- Born: 1594 or 1602; Rio de Janeiro, State of Brazil or Cádiz, Kingdom of Spain
- Died: 1688; Lisbon, Kingdom of Portugal
- Occupations: Soldier, colonial governor
- Known for: Fighting the Dutch in Brazil, and expelling the Dutch from Angola and São Tomé.

Salvador Correia de Sá e Benevides (Note: Contemporary sources spelt his last name Benavides. His second given name is also spelt Corrêa, an older form of the surname Correia.) (1594 – 1 January 1688) was a Portuguese admiral and crown administrator. In 1625 he fought the Dutch invasion of Salvador in Brazil and regained Angola and São Tomé Island from the Dutch in 1647. He was the governor of Rio de Janeiro, parts of Southern Brazil and Angola.

== Biography ==
Salvador Correia de Sá was born in the family of the Sás, being the great-grandson of Mem de Sá, third Governor-General of Brazil, and of Estácio de Sá, founder of the city of Rio de Janeiro. In 1625 he fought the Dutch invasion of Salvador, joining a combined Spanish and Portuguese fleet of fifty-two ships that regained the control of the former capital of Brazil. He became governor of the Rio de Janeiro captaincy in 1637.

He acclaimed John IV of Portugal in 1641 at the beginning of the Portuguese Restoration War, to regain Portuguese independence from the Iberian Union. This cost him many of the assets he held in Peru and Spain. Back in Portugal, in 1643 was named general of the fleets of Brazil and member of the Portuguese Overseas Council, established in 1643. In order to oust the Dutch from their occupation in Africa, in 1647 he commanded a fleet that regained Angola and São Tomé for Portugal, then he was appointed governor of Angola. From 1658 until 1662, was appointed governor and captain-general of the captaincy in southern Brazil. He harshly suppressed a revolt in 1661, which cost him the governorship. He was out of favor for several years, but then remained until death as a member of the Overseas Council. In 1678, he volunteered to command the expedition to Angola to moderate rebellion, near Mombasa, but his advanced age did not permit him to do so.

== See also ==
- Angolan Wars
