= Christianization =

Conversion of society or culture to Christianity

Christianization (or Christianisation) is the process or result of the conversion to Christianity. Christianization has, for the most part, spread through missions by individual conversions, but has also been the result of violence. "Christianization" also refers the conversion of previously non-Christian practices, spaces and places to Christian uses and names. In a related manner, the term refers to the changes that naturally emerge in a nation when sufficient numbers of individuals convert, or when secular leaders require those changes.

It began in the Roman Empire when the early individual followers of Jesus became itinerant preachers in response to the command recorded in Matthew 28:19 (sometimes called the Great Commission) to go to all the nations of the world and preach the good news of the gospel of Jesus. Christianization spread through the Roman Empire and into its surrounding nations in its first three hundred years. The process of Christianizing the Roman Empire was never completed, and Armenia became the first nation to designate Christianity as its state religion in 301.

After 479, Christianization spread through missions north into western Europe. In the High and Late Middle Ages, Christianization was instrumental in the creation of new nations in what became Eastern Europe, and in the spread of literacy there. In the modern era, Christianization became associated with colonialism, which, in an almost equal distribution, missionaries both participated in and opposed. In the post-colonial era, it has produced dramatic growth in China as well as in many former colonial lands in much of Africa. Christianization has become a diverse, pluralist, global phenomenon of the largest religion in the world.

== Missions ==
Historian Dana L. Robert has written that the significant role of Christianization in shaping multiple nations, cultures and societies is understandable only through the concept of Christian mission. Missionaries "go out" among those who have not heard the gospel and preach. Missions, as the primary means of Christianization, are driven by a universalist logic, cannot be equated with western colonialism, but are instead a multi-cultural, often complex, historical process.

David Abulafia and Nóra Berend speak of religious activity in relation to the "frontier" regions at the borders of civilizations. Berend sees a frontier as "a contact zone where an interchange of cultures was constantly taking place". In this way, the missionary religions of Buddhism, Islam and Christianity spread themselves geographically, through teaching and preaching, with interaction sometimes producing conflict, and other times mingling and accommodation.

Alan Neely writes that, "wherever Christianity (or any other faith) is carried from one culture to another, intentionally or not, consciously or not, it is either adapted to that culture or it becomes irrelevant." In his book Christian Mission, Neely provides multiple historical examples of adaptation, accommodation, indigenization, inculturation, autochthonization and contextualization as the means of successful Christianization through missions. Neely's definitions are these:

- Accommodation is a form of adaptation that occurs when the missionary adjusts their own thinking and vocabulary to keep only what is essential and let go of what is expendable in communicating the faith. (Note: The earliest accommodation was made by the Jerusalem Council in Acts 15:1-29 when accepting Gentiles. Pope Gregory's seventh century letter to Mellitus can be seen as another example (there are also numerous examples of those who disagreed with Gregory and followed the "eradication" approach instead.))
- Indigenization, in this application, refers to taking something that is native to one culture and making it native to another culture; that is, taking Christianity and making it more native by including aspects of native language and practices.
- Autochthonization means the same as indigenization, but is specific to Spanish and Portuguese.
- Inculturation, or acculturation, is the gradual process of adopting aspects of Christianity, but it has often mistakenly been seen as socialization to another culture. Changes of dress, customs and names have sometimes been confused with actual Christianization which involves internal and not simply external changes. Whenever the gospel has been linked to a particular culture, Gustavo Gutiérrez forcefully insists the result has been subjugation not conversion.
- Contextualization is a way to be faithful to the essence of the message while also being relevant to the people to whom it is being presented. In the 21st century, contextualization has led missions to build daycare centers, wells for clean water, schools, address housing and economic injustice issues and more. It depends on the people being addressed, as well as "geography, language, ethnicity, political and economic systems, class gender and age, time frame, sense of identity, religion, values and history".

== Individual conversion ==
James P. Hanigan writes that individual conversion is the foundational experience and the central message of Christianization, adding that Christian conversion begins with an experience of being "thrown off balance" through cognitive and psychological "disequilibrium", followed by an "awakening" of consciousness and a new awareness of God. Hanigan compares it to "death and rebirth, a turning away..., a putting off of the old..., a change of mind and heart". The person responds by acknowledging and confessing personal lostness and sinfulness, and then accepting a call to holiness thus restoring balance. This initial internal conversion is only the beginning of Christianization; it is followed by practices that further the process of Christianizing the individual's lifestyle, which according to Hanigan, will include ethical changes.

While Christian theologians such as the fourth century Augustine and the ninth century Alcuin maintained that conversion must be voluntary, there are historical examples of coercion in conversion. Constantine used both law and force to eradicate the practice of sacrifice and repress heresy though not specifically to promote conversion. Theodosius also wrote laws to eliminate heresies, but made no requirement for pagans or Jews to convert to Christianity. However, the sixth century Eastern Roman emperor Justinian I and the seventh century emperor Heraclius attempted to force cultural and religious uniformity by requiring baptism of the Jews. In 612, the Visigothic King Sisebut, prompted by Heraclius, declared the obligatory conversion of all Jews in Spain. In the many new nation-states being formed in Eastern Europe of the Late Middle Ages, some kings and princes pressured their people to adopt the new religion. And in the Northern crusades, the fighting princes obtained widespread conversion through political pressure or military coercion.

=== Baptism ===
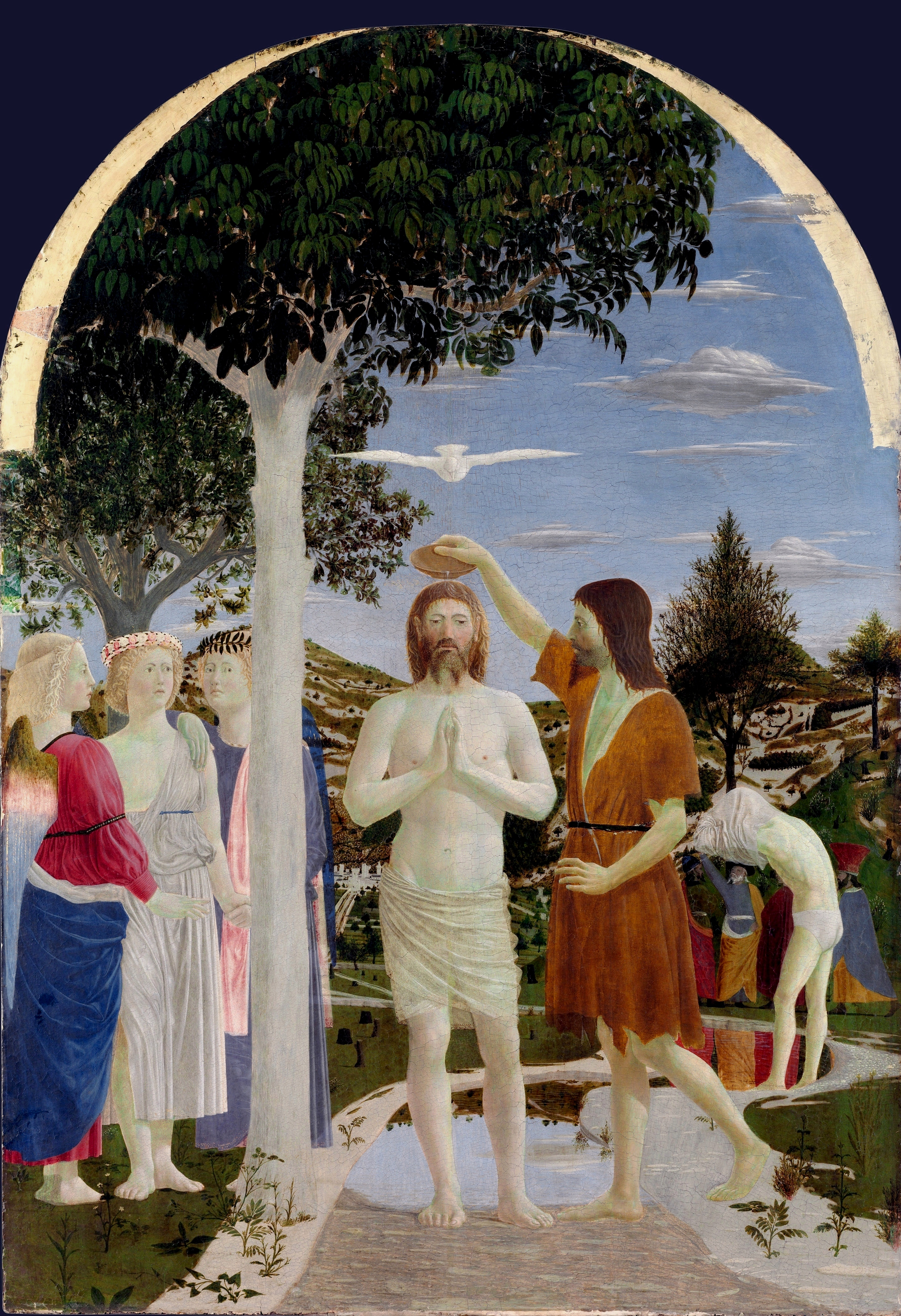
The Baptism of Christ (Piero della Francesca)

Jesus began his ministry after his baptism by John the Baptist which can be dated to approximately AD 28–35 based on references by the Jewish historian Josephus in his (Antiquities 18.5.2).

Individual conversion is followed by the initiation rite of baptism. In Christianity's earliest communities, candidates for baptism were introduced by someone willing to stand surety for their character and conduct. Baptism created a set of responsibilities within the Christian community. Candidates for baptism were instructed in the major tenets of the faith, examined for moral living, sat separately in worship, were not yet allowed to receive the communion eucharist, but were still generally expected to demonstrate commitment to the community, and obedience to Christ's commands, before being accepted into the community as a full member. This could take months to years.

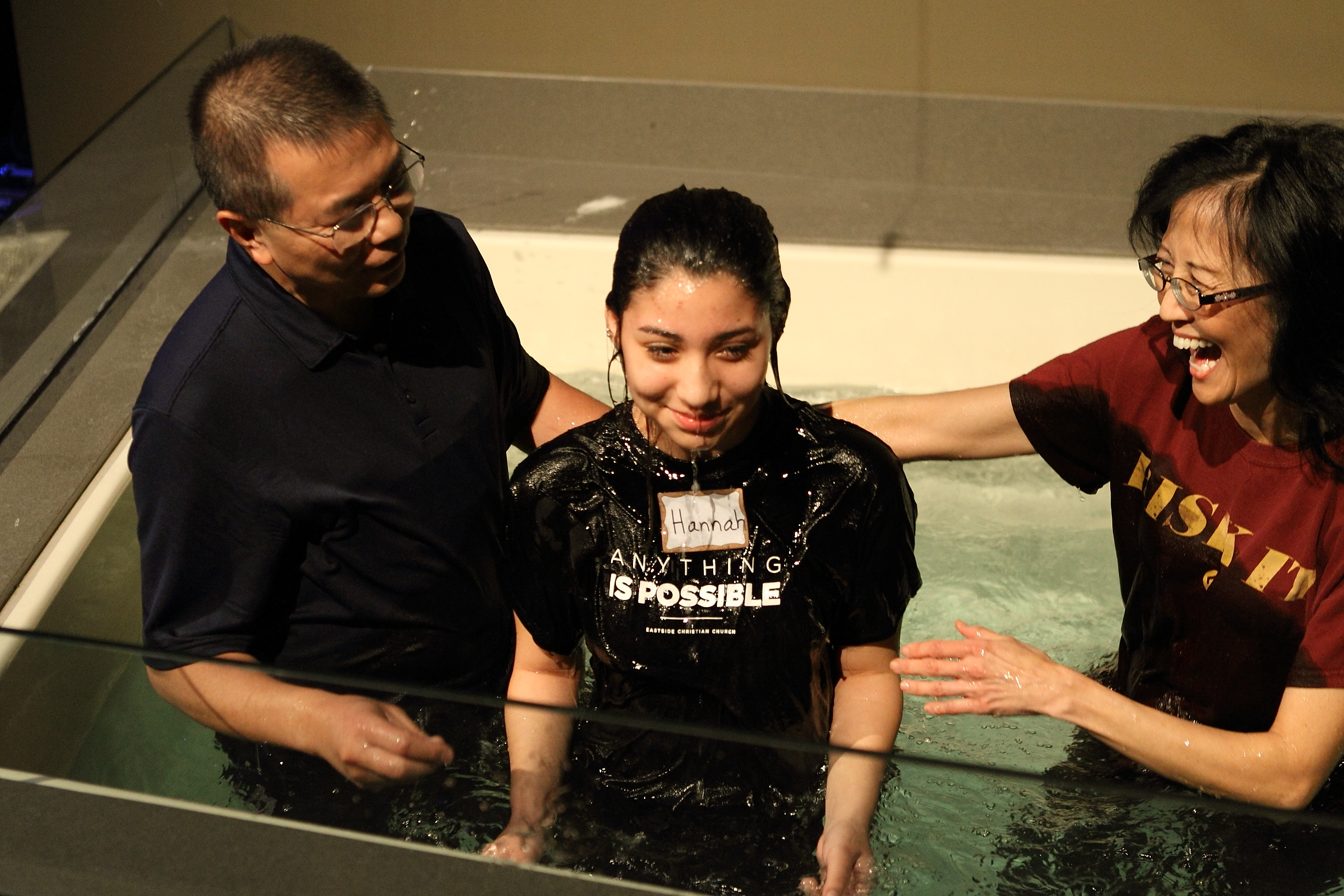
A baptism at an Evangelical church

The normal practice in the ancient church was baptism by immersion of the whole head and body of an adult, with the exception of infants in danger of death, until the fifth or sixth century. Historian Philip Schaff has written that sprinkling, or pouring of water on the head of a sick or dying person, where immersion was impractical, was also practiced in ancient times and up through the twelfth century. Infant baptism was controversial for the Protestant Reformers, but according to Schaff, it was practiced by the ancients and is neither required nor forbidden in the New Testament.

=== Eucharist ===
The celebration of the eucharist (also called communion) was the common unifier for early Christian communities, and remains one of the most important of Christian rituals. Early Christians believed the Christian message, the celebration of communion (the Eucharist) and the rite of baptism came directly from Jesus of Nazareth.

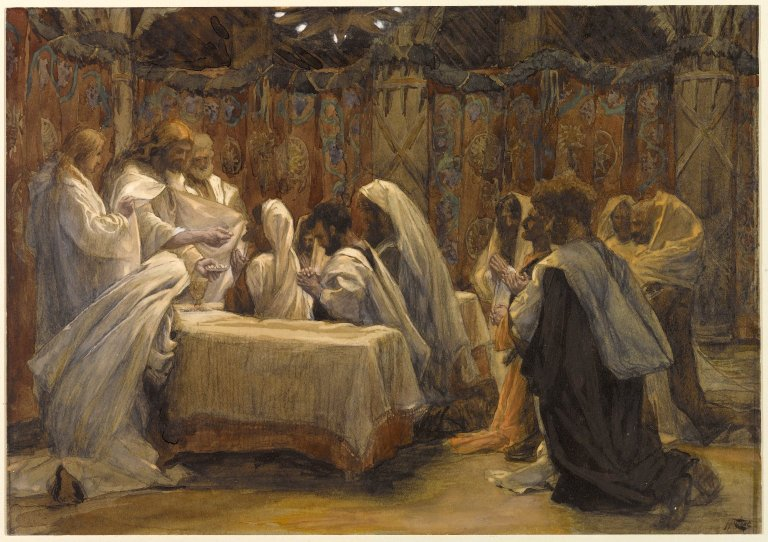
The Communion of the Apostles by James Tissot

Father Enrico Mazza writes that the "Eucharist is an imitation of the Last Supper" when Jesus gathered his followers for their last meal together the night before he was arrested and killed. While the majority share the view of Mazza, there are others such as New Testament scholar Bruce Chilton who argue that there were multiple origins of the Eucharist.

In the Middle Ages, the Eucharist came to be understood as a sacrament (wherein God is present) that evidenced Christ's sacrifice, and the prayer given with the rite was to include two strophes of thanksgiving and one of petition. The prayer later developed into the modern version of a narrative, a memorial to Christ and an invocation of the Holy Spirit.

=== Confirmation ===
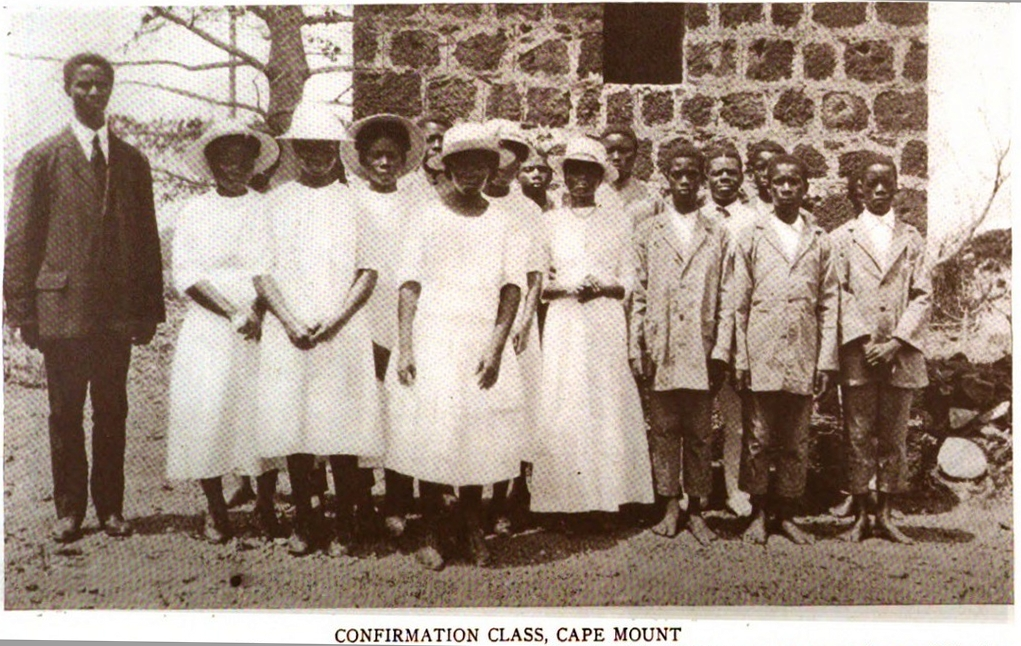
Confirmation class of 1918 at Cape Mount

In the early 1500s, confirmation was added to the rites of initiation. While baptism, instruction, and Eucharist have remained the essential elements of initiation in all Christian communities, theologian Knut Alfsvåg writes on the differing status of confirmation in different denominations:

Some see baptism, confirmation, and first communion as different elements in a unified rite through which one becomes a part of the Christian church. Others consider confirmation a separate rite which may or may not be considered a condition for becoming a fully accepted member of the church in the sense that one is invited to take part in the celebration of the Eucharist. Among those who see confirmation as a separate rite some see it as a sacrament, while others consider it a combination of intercessory prayer and graduation ceremony after a period of instruction.

== Places and practices ==
Christianization has at times involved appropriation, removal and/or redesignation of aspects of native religion and former sacred spaces. This was allowed, or required, or sometimes forbidden by the missionaries involved. The church adapts to its local cultural context, just as local culture and places are adapted to the church, or in other words, Christianization has always worked in both directions: Christianity absorbs from native culture as it is absorbed into it.

When Christianity spread beyond Judaea, it first arrived in Jewish diaspora communities. The Christian church was modeled on the synagogue, and Christian philosophers synthesized their Christian views with Semitic monotheism and Greek thought. The Latin church adopted aspects of Platonic thought and used the Latin names for months and weekdays that etymologically derived from Roman mythology.

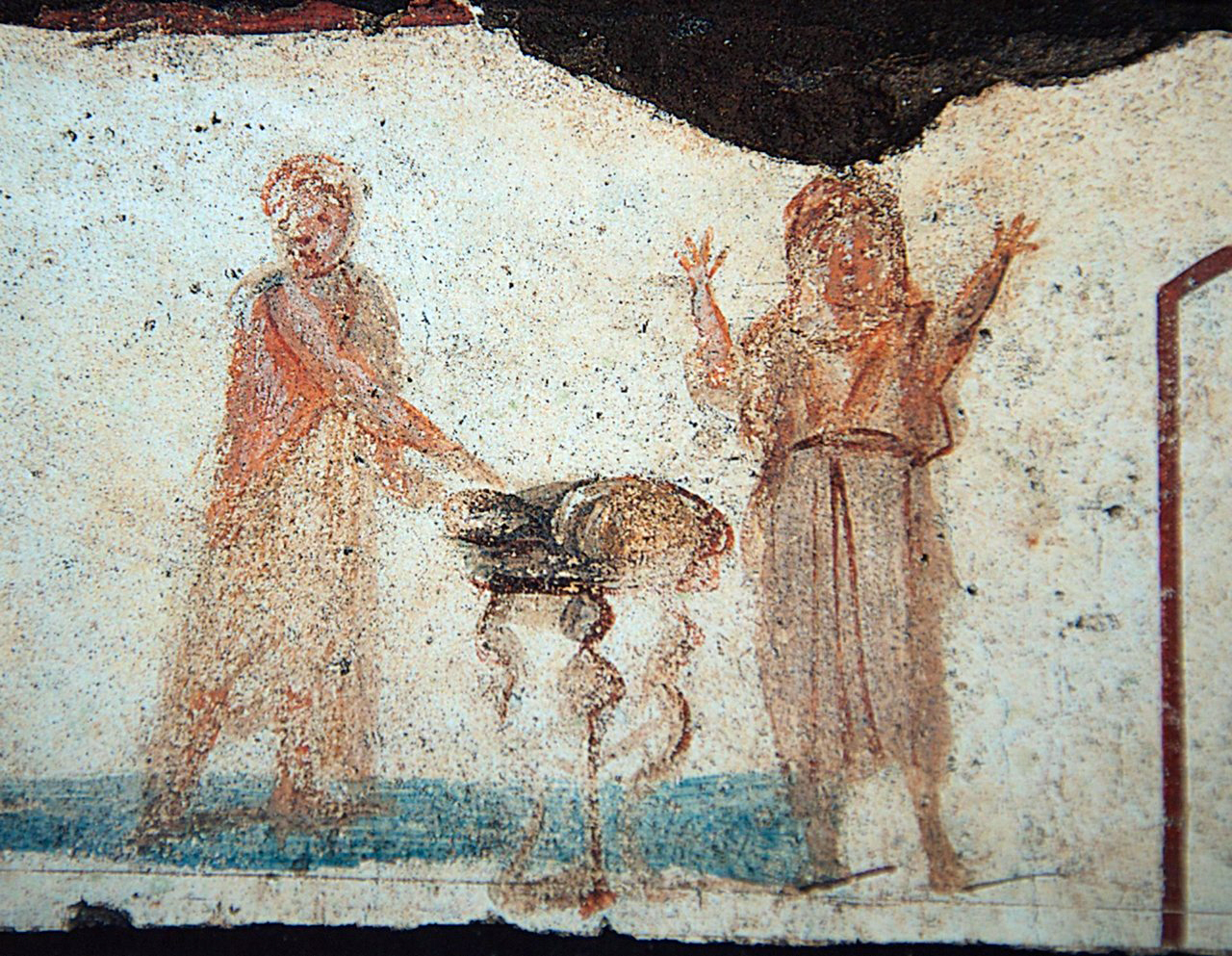
Early depiction of Eucharist celebration found in catacombs beneath Rome

Christian art in the catacombs beneath Rome rose out of a reinterpretation of Jewish and pagan symbolism. While many new subjects appear for the first time in the Christian catacombs – i.e. the Good Shepherd, Baptism, and the Eucharistic meal – the Orant figures (women praying with upraised hands) probably came directly from pagan art. (Note: The Ichthys, or Christian Fish, also known colloquially as the Jesus Fish, was an early Christian symbol. Early Christians used the Ichthys symbol to identify themselves as followers of Jesus Christ and to proclaim their commitment to Christianity. Ichthys is the Ancient Greek word for "fish", which explains why the sign resembles a fish; the Greek word ιχθυς is an acronym for the phrase transliterated as "Iesous Christos Theou Yios Soter", that is, "Jesus Christ, God's Son, the Savior". There are several other possible connections with Christian tradition relating to this symbol: that it was a reference to the feeding of the multitude; that it referred to some of the apostles having previously worked as fishermen; or that the word Christ was pronounced by Jews in a similar way to the Hebrew word for fish (though Nuna is the normal Aramaic word for fish, making this seem unlikely).)

Bruce David Forbes says "Some way or another, Christmas was started to compete with rival Roman religions, or to co-opt the winter celebrations as a way to spread Christianity, or to baptize the winter festivals with Christian meaning in an effort to limit their [drunken] excesses. Most likely all three". Michelle Salzman has shown that, in the process of converting the Roman Empire's aristocracy, Christianity absorbed the values of that aristocracy.

Some scholars have suggested that characteristics of some pagan gods — or at least their roles — transferred to Christian saints after the fourth century. Demetrius of Thessaloniki became venerated as the patron of agriculture during the Middle Ages. According to historian Hans Kloft, that was because the Eleusinian Mysteries, Demeter's cult, ended in the 4th century, and the Greek rural population gradually transferred her rites and roles onto the Christian saint.

Several early Christian writers, including Justin (2nd century), Tertullian, and Origen (3rd century) wrote of Mithraists copying Christian beliefs and practices yet remaining pagan.

In both Jewish and Roman tradition, genetic families were buried together, but an important cultural shift took place in the way Christians buried one another: they gathered unrelated Christians into a common burial-space, as if they really were one family, "commemorated them with homogeneous memorials and expanded the commemorative audience to the entire local community of coreligionists", thereby redefining the concept of family.

=== Early missions ===
Though Roman papal views saw the evangelisation of the West as a Roman enterprise, Greek influence also played a part. Egyptian Coptic Christian missionaries worked in Western Europe: in Italy and possibly as far north as Ireland. Meanwhile, Syriac Christianity spread in Asia. Later, the Hiberno-Scottish mission spread Celtic Christianity in northern Europe, while Byzantine Greek and Roman Latin versions of Christianity competed (especially) in Slavic eastern Europe. As a result of different Christian practices, varying cultural traditions and theologies could clash over the centuries.

=== Temple conversion within Roman Empire ===
Ancient Roman Temple, Évora. Believed to have been dedicated to the Roman goddess Diana, this 2nd or 3rd century temple survived because it was converted to a number of uses over the centuries – such as an armory, theater and animal slaughterhouse.

R. P. C. Hanson says the direct conversion of temples into churches began in the mid-fifth century but only in a few isolated incidents. (Note: Scholarship has been divided over whether this was a general effort to demolish the pagan past, simple pragmatism, or perhaps an attempt to preserve the past's art and architecture.) According to modern archaeology, of the thousands of temples that existed across the empire, 120 pagan temples were converted to churches, with the majority dated after the fifth century. It is likely this stems from the fact that these buildings remained officially in public use, ownership could only be transferred by the emperor, and temples remained protected by law.

In the fourth century, there were no conversions of temples in the city of Rome itself. It is only with the formation of the Papal State in the eighth century, (when the emperor's properties in the West came into the possession of the bishop of Rome), that the conversions of temples in Rome took off in earnest.

According to Dutch historian Feyo L. Schuddeboom, individual temples and temple sites in the city of Rome were converted to churches primarily to preserve their exceptional architecture. They were also used pragmatically because of the importance of their location at the center of town.

=== Temple and icon destruction ===
During his long reign (307–337), Constantine (the first Christian Roman emperor) both destroyed and built a few temples, plundered more, and generally neglected the rest.

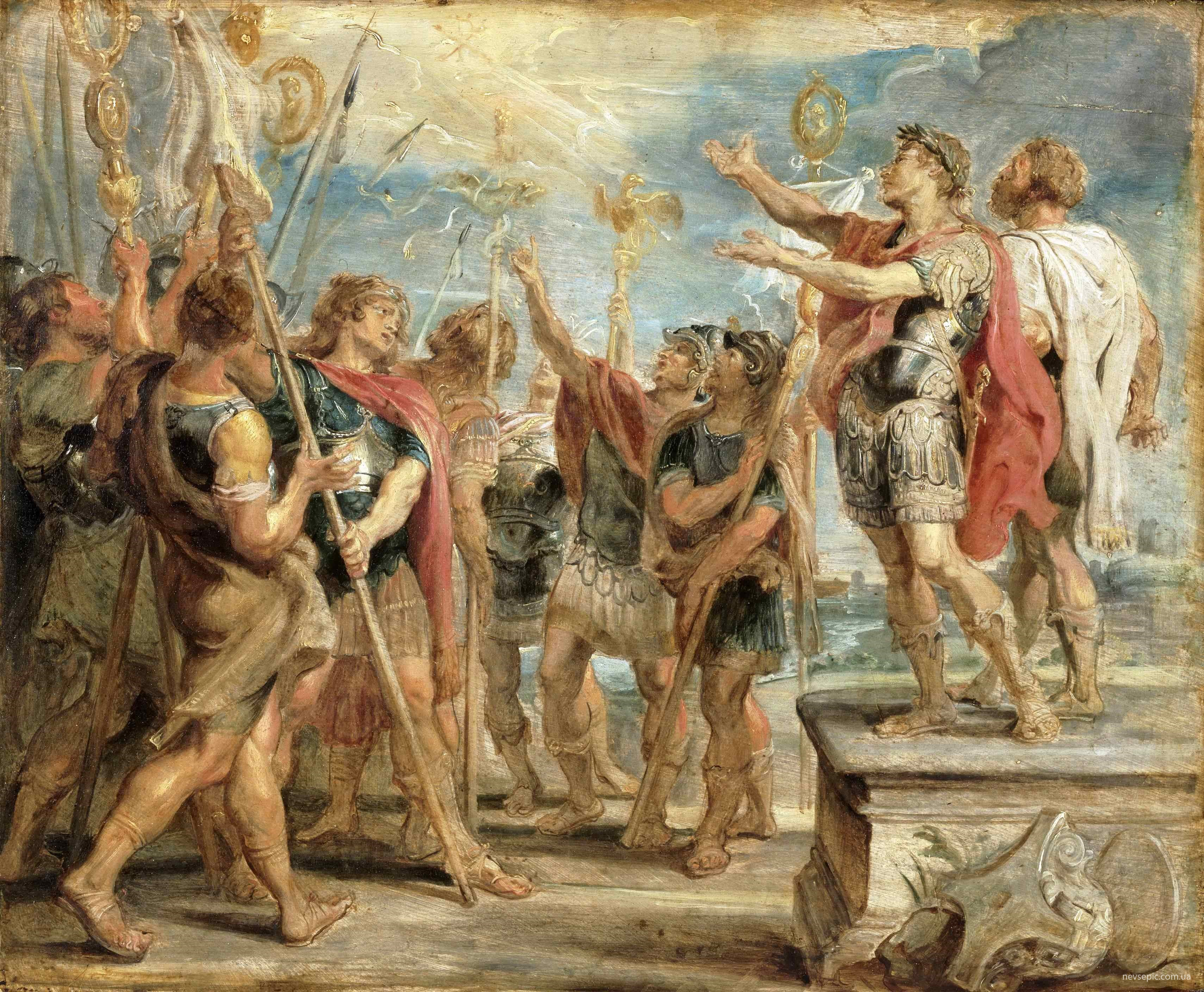
Constantine's conversion, by Rubens

In the 300 years prior to the reign of Constantine, Roman authority had confiscated various church properties. For example, Christian historians recorded that Hadrian (2nd century), when in the military colony of Aelia Capitolina (Jerusalem), had constructed a temple to Aphrodite on the site of the crucifixion of Jesus on Golgotha hill in order to suppress veneration there. Constantine vigorously reclaimed such properties whenever these issues were brought to his attention, and he used reclamation to justify the destruction of Aphrodite's temple. Using the vocabulary of reclamation, Constantine acquired several more sites of Christian significance in the Holy Land.

In Eusebius' church history there is a bold claim of a Constantinian campaign to destroy the temples, however, there are discrepancies in the evidence. Temple destruction is attested to in 43 cases in the written sources, but only four have been confirmed by archaeological evidence. (Note: At the sacred oak and spring at Mamre, a site venerated and occupied by Jews, Christians, and pagans alike, the literature says Constantine ordered the burning of the idols, the destruction of the altar, and erection of a church on the spot of the temple. The archaeology of the site shows that Constantine's church, along with its attendant buildings, only occupied a peripheral sector of the precinct, leaving the rest unhindered. In Gaul of the fourth century, 2.4% of known temples and religious sites were destroyed, some by barbarians. In Africa, the city of Cyrene has good evidence of the burning of several temples; Asia Minor has produced one weak possibility; in Greece the only strong candidate may relate to a barbarian raid instead of Christians. Egypt has produced no archaeologically confirmed temple-destructions from this period except the Serapeum. In Italy there is one; Britain has the highest percentage with 2 out of 40 temples.) Historians Frank R. Trombley and Ramsay MacMullen explain that discrepancies between literary sources and archaeological evidence exist because it is common for details in the literary sources to be ambiguous and unclear. For example, Malalas claimed Constantine destroyed all the temples, then he said Theodisius destroyed them all, then he said Constantine converted them all to churches. (Note: A number of elements coincided to end the temples, but none of them were strictly religious. Earthquakes caused much of the destruction of this era. Civil conflict and external invasions also destroyed many temples and shrines. Economics was also a factor. The Roman economy of the third and fourth centuries struggled, and traditional polytheism was expensive and dependent upon donations from the state and private elites. Roger S. Bagnall reports that imperial financial support of the Temples declined markedly after Augustus. Lower budgets meant the physical decline of urban structures of all types. This progressive decay was accompanied by an increased trade in salvaged building materials, as the practice of recycling became common in Late Antiquity. Economic struggles meant that necessity drove much of the destruction and conversion of pagan religious monuments.)

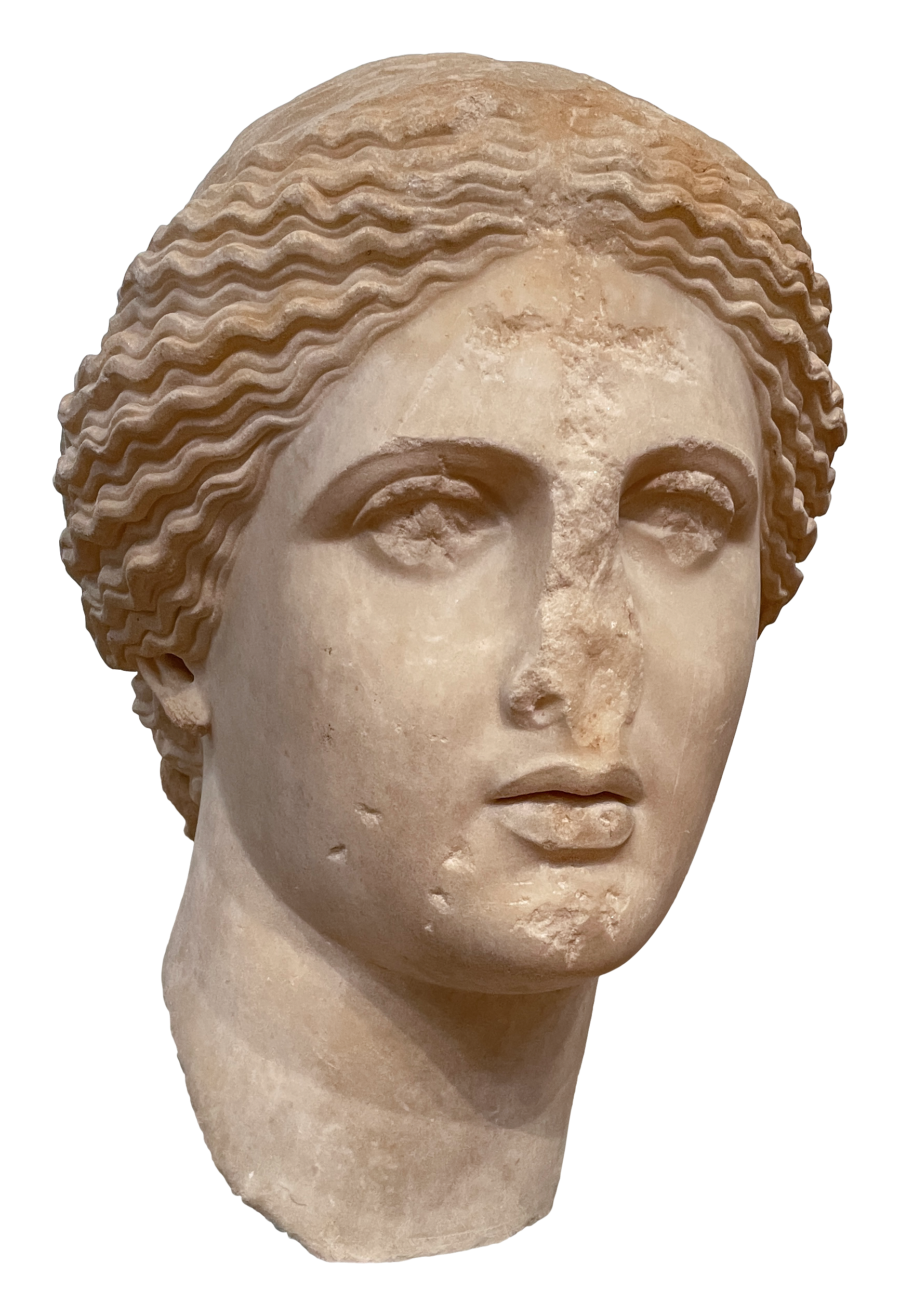
Head of Aphrodite, 1st century AD copy of an original by Praxiteles. The Christian cross on the chin and forehead was intended to "deconsecrate" a holy pagan artifact. Found in the Agora of Athens. National Archaeological Museum in Athens.

Additional calculated acts of desecration – removing the hands and feet or mutilating heads and genitals of statues, and "purging sacred precincts with fire" – were acts committed by the common people during the early centuries. (Note: There are only a few examples of Christian officials having any involvement in the violent destruction of pagan shrines. Sulpicius Severus, in his Vita, describes Martin of Tours as a dedicated destroyer of temples and sacred trees, saying "wherever he destroyed heathen temples, there he used immediately to build either churches or monasteries". There is agreement that Martin destroyed temples and shrines, but there is a discrepancy between the written text and archaeology: none of the churches attributed to Martin can be shown to have existed in Gaul in the fourth century. In the 380s, one eastern official (generally identified as the praetorian prefect Cynegius), used the army under his control and bands of monks to destroy temples in the eastern provinces. According to Alan Cameron, this violence was unofficial and without support from Christian clergy or state magistrates.) While seen as 'proving' the impotence of the gods, pagan icons were also seen as having been "polluted" by the practice of sacrifice. They were, therefore, in need of "desacralization" or "deconsecration". Antique historian Peter Brown says that, while it was in some ways studiously vindictive, it was not indiscriminate or extensive. Once temples, icons or statues were detached from 'the contagion' of sacrifice, they were seen as having returned to innocence. Many statues and temples were then preserved as art. Professor of Byzantine history Helen Saradi-Mendelovici writes that this process implies appreciation of antique art and a conscious desire to find a way to include it in Christian culture.

Aspects of paganism remained part of the civic culture of the Roman Empire till its end. Public spectacles were popular and resisted Christianization: gladiatorial combats (munera), animal hunts (venationes), theatrical performances (ludi scaenici), and chariot races (ludi circenses) were accommodated by Roman society even while that society disagreed and debated the definition and scope of christianization. Historian of antiquity Richard Lim writes that it was within this process of debate that "the category of the secular was developed ... [which] helped buffer select cultural practices, including Roman spectacles, from the claims of those who advocated a more thorough christianization of Roman society." This produced a vigorous public culture shared by polytheists, Jews and Christians alike. (Note: By the time a fifth-century pope attempted to denounce the Lupercalia as 'pagan superstition', religion scholar Elizabeth Clark says "it fell on deaf ears". In Historian R. A. Markus's reading of events, this marked a colonization by Christians of pagan values and practices. For Alan Cameron, the mixed culture that included the continuation of the circuses, amphitheaters and games – sans sacrifice – on into the sixth century involved the secularization of paganism rather than appropriation by Christianity.)

The Roman Empire cannot be considered Christianized before Justinian I in the sixth century, though most scholars agree the Empire was never fully Christianized. Archaeologist and historian Judith Herrin has written in her article on "Book Burning as Purification" that under Justinian, there was considerable destruction. The decree of 528 barred pagans from state office when, decades later, Justinian ordered a "persecution of surviving Hellenes, accompanied by the burning of pagan books, pictures and statues". This took place at the Kynêgion. Herrin says it is difficult to assess the degree to which Christians are responsible for the losses of ancient documents in many cases, but in the mid-sixth century, active persecution in Constantinople destroyed many ancient texts.

=== Other sacred sites ===
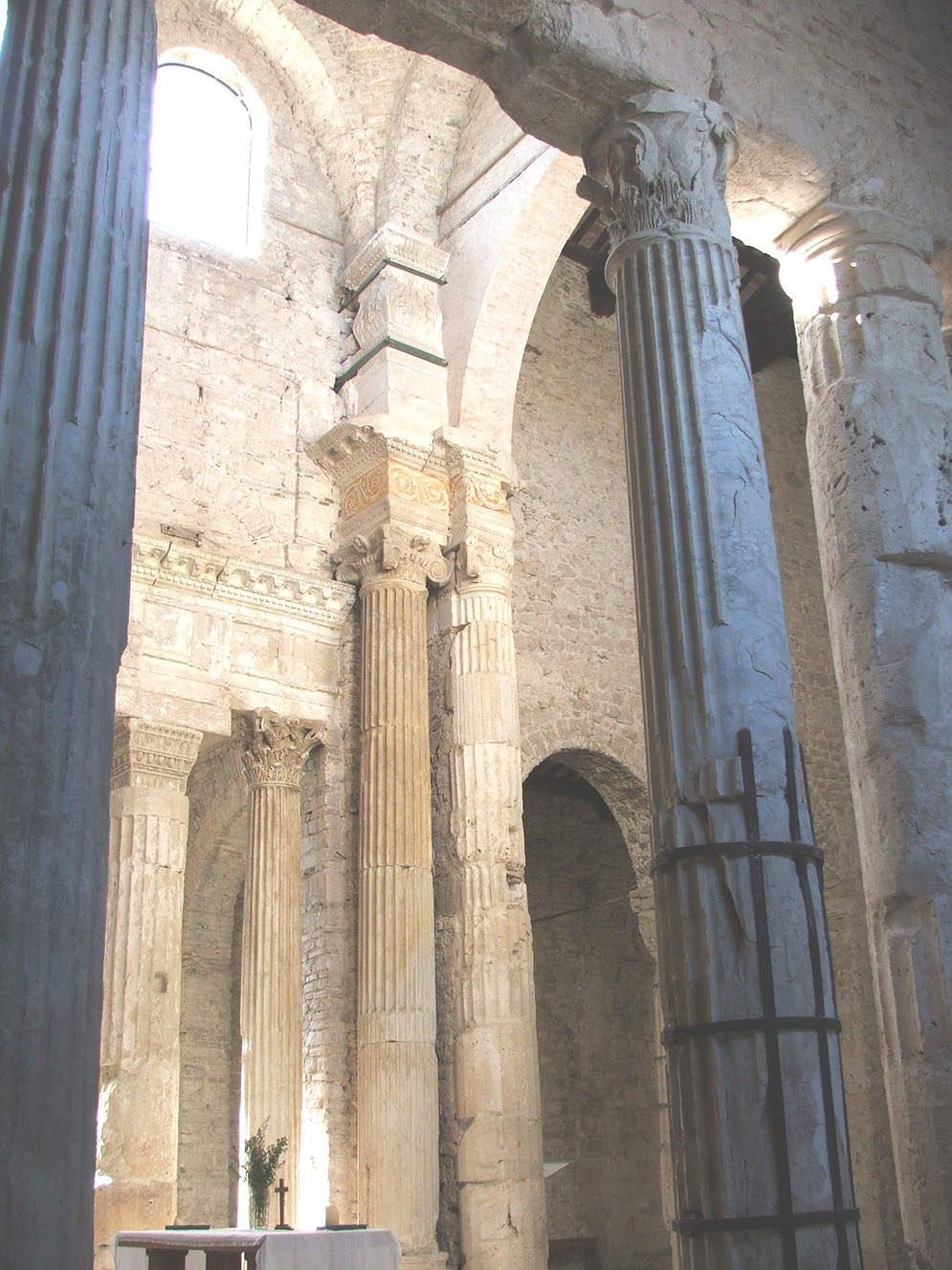
Physical Christianization: the choir of San Salvatore, Spoleto, occupies the cella of a Roman temple

The "Venerable Bede" was a Christian monk (672–735) who wrote what sociologist and anthropologist Hutton Webster describes as "the first truly historical work by an Englishman" describing the Christianization of Britain. Pope Gregory I had sent Augustine and several helpers as missionaries to Kent and its powerful King Ethelbert. One of those helpers, Abbott Mellitus, received this letter from Gregory on the proper methods for converting the local people.

I think that the temples of the idols in that nation ought not to be destroyed; but let the idols that are in them be destroyed; let holy water be made and sprinkled in the said temples, and let altars be erected and relics placed. For if those temples are well built, it is requisite that they be converted from the worship of devils to the service of the true God; that the people, seeing that their temples are not destroyed, may remove error from their hearts, and, knowing and adoring the true God, may the more familiarly resort to the places to which they have become accustomed.

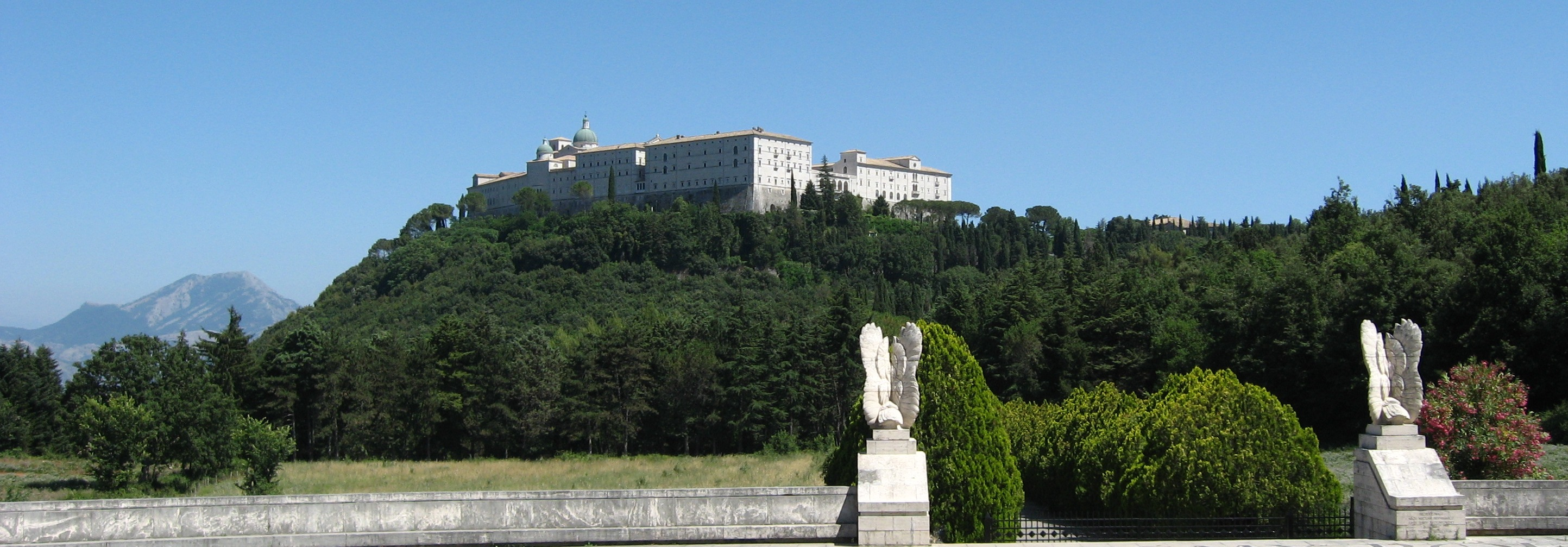
Monte Cassino Abbey now sits on top of the hill.

When Benedict moved to Monte Cassino about 530, a small temple with a sacred grove and a separate altar to Apollo stood on the hill. The population was still mostly pagan. The land was most likely granted as a gift to Benedict from one of his supporters. This would explain the authoritative way he immediately cut down the groves, removed the altar, and built an oratory before the locals were converted.

Christianization of the Irish landscape was a complex process that varied considerably depending on local conditions. Ancient sites were viewed with veneration, and were excluded or included for Christian use based largely on diverse local feeling about their nature, character, ethos and even location.

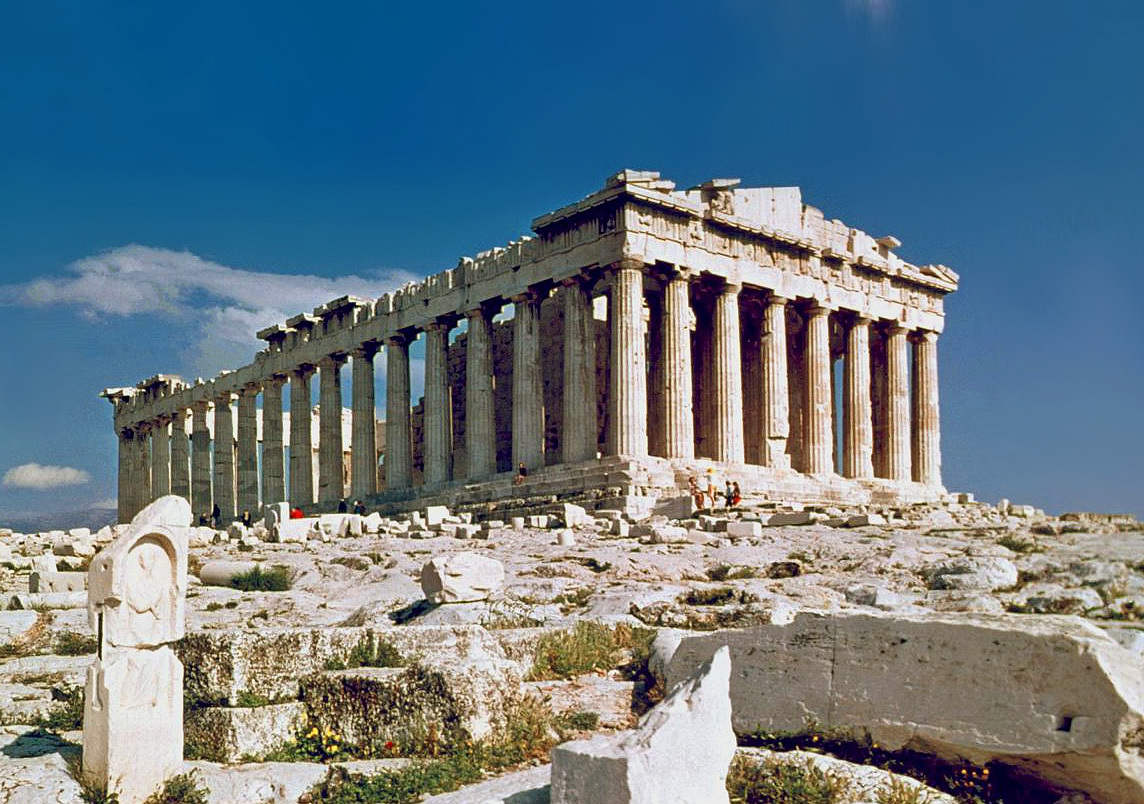
The Parthenon in Athens

In Greece, Byzantine scholar Alison Frantz has won consensus support of her view that, aside from a few rare instances such as the Parthenon which was converted to a church in the sixth century, temple conversions (including the Erechtheion and the Theseion) took place in and after the seventh century, after the displacements caused by the Slavic invasions.

In early Anglo-Saxon England, non-stop religious development meant paganism and Christianity were never completely separate. Archaeologist Lorcan Harney has reported that Anglo-Saxon churches were built by pagan barrows after the 11th century. Richard A. Fletcher suggests that, within the British Isles and other areas of northern Europe that were formerly druidic, there are a dense number of holy wells and holy springs that are now attributed to a saint, often a highly local saint, unknown elsewhere. In earlier times many of these were seen as guarded by supernatural forces such as the melusina, and many such pre-Christian holy wells appear to have survived as baptistries. According to Willibald's Life of Saint Boniface, about 723, the missioner Boniface cut down the sacred Donar's Oak also called the 'Oak of Jupiter' and used the lumber to build a church dedicated to St. Peter.

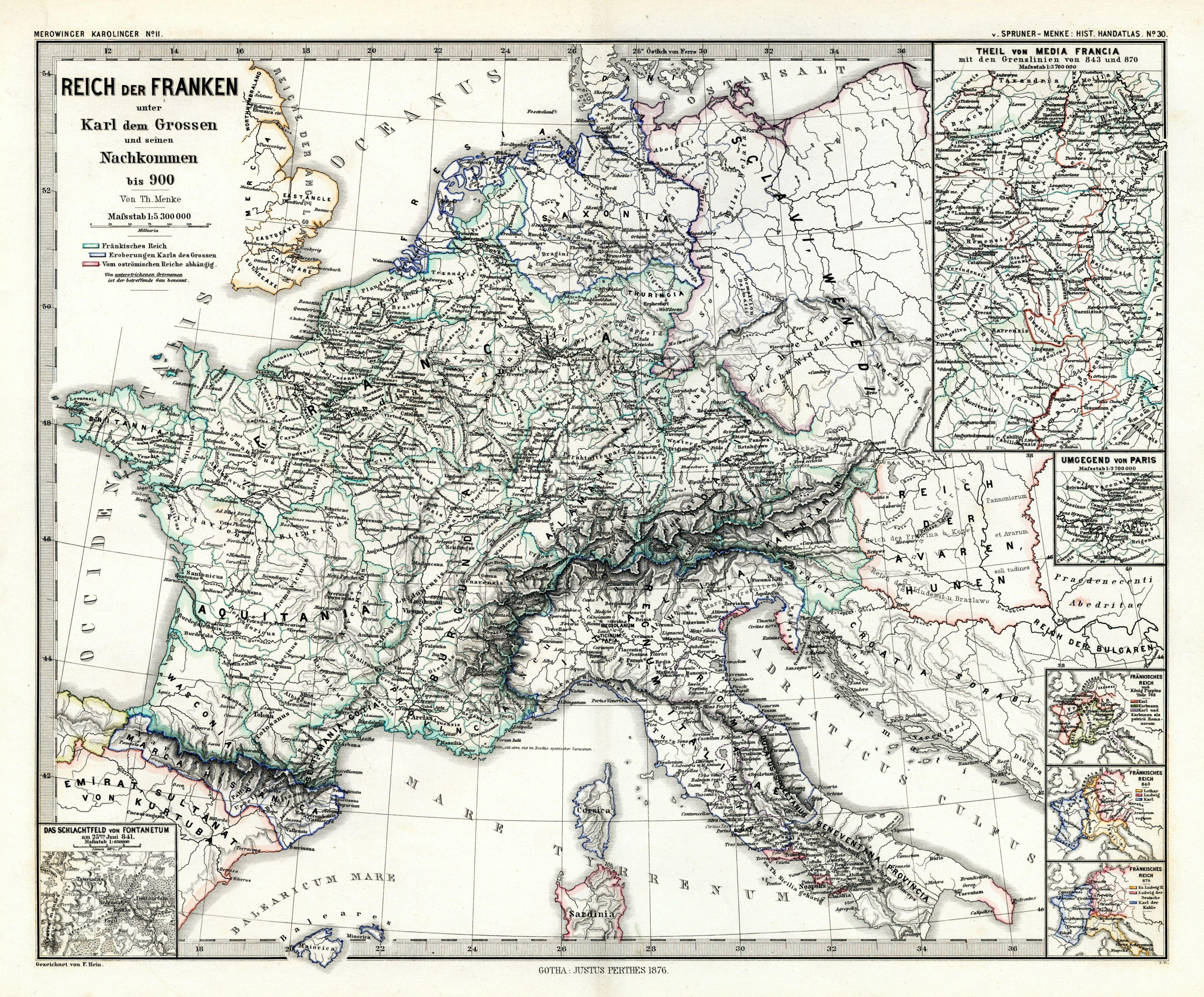
The Frankish kingdom under Charlemagne and his descendants to 900

By 771, Charlemagne had inherited the long established conflict with the Saxons who regularly specifically targeted churches and monasteries in brutal raids into Frankish territory. In January 772, Charlemagne retaliated with an attack on the Saxon's most important holy site, a sacred grove in southern Engria. "It was dominated by the Irminsul ('Great Pillar'), which was either a (wooden) pillar or an ancient tree and presumably symbolized Germanic religion's 'Universal Tree'. The Franks cut down the Irminsul, looted the accumulated sacrificial treasures (which the King distributed among his men), and torched the entire grove... Charlemagne ordered a Frankish fortress to be erected at the Eresburg".

Early historians of Scandinavian Christianization wrote of dramatic events associated with Christianization in the manner of political propagandists according to John Kousgärd Sørensen who references the 1987 survey by the historian of medieval Scandinavia, Birgit Sawyer. Sørensen focuses on the changes of names, both personal and place names, showing that cultic elements were not banned and are still in evidence today. Large numbers of pre-Christian names survive into the present day, and Sørensen says this demonstrates the process of Christianization in Denmark was peaceful and gradual and did not include the complete eradication of the old cultic associations. However, there are local differences.

Outside of Scandinavia, old names did not fare as well.

The highest point in Paris was known in the pre-Christian period as the Hill of Mercury, Mons Mercuri. Evidence of the worship of this Roman god here was removed in the early Christian period and in the ninth century a sanctuary was built here, dedicated to the 10000 martyrs. The hill was then called Mons Martyrum, the name by which it is still known (Mont Martres) (Longnon 1923, 377; Vincent 1937, 307).

San Marino in northern Italy, the shrine of Saint Marino, replaced a pre-Christian cultic name for the place: Monte Titano, where the Titans had been worshipped (Pfeiffer 1980, 79).

[The] Monte Giove "Hill of Jupiter" came to be known as San Bernardo, in honour of St Bernhard (Pfeiffer 1980, 79).

In Germany an old Wodanesberg "Hill of Ódin" was renamed Godesberg (Bach 1956, 553). Ä controversial but not unreasonable suggestion is that the locality named by Ädam of Bremen as Fosetisland "land of the god Foseti" is to be identified with Helgoland "the holy land", the island off the coast of northern Friesland which, according to Ädam, was treated with superstitious respect by all sailors, particularly pirates (Laur 1960, 360 with references).

The practice of replacing pagan beliefs and motifs with Christian, and purposefully not recording the pagan history (such as the names of pagan gods, or details of pagan religious practices), has been compared to the practice of damnatio memoriae.

== Nations ==
=== Roman Empire to Early Middle Ages (1 to 800) ===
==== Christianization without coercion ====
There is agreement among twenty-first century scholars that Christianization of the Roman Empire in its first three centuries did not happen by imposition. Christianization emerged naturally as the cumulative result of multiple individual decisions and behaviors.

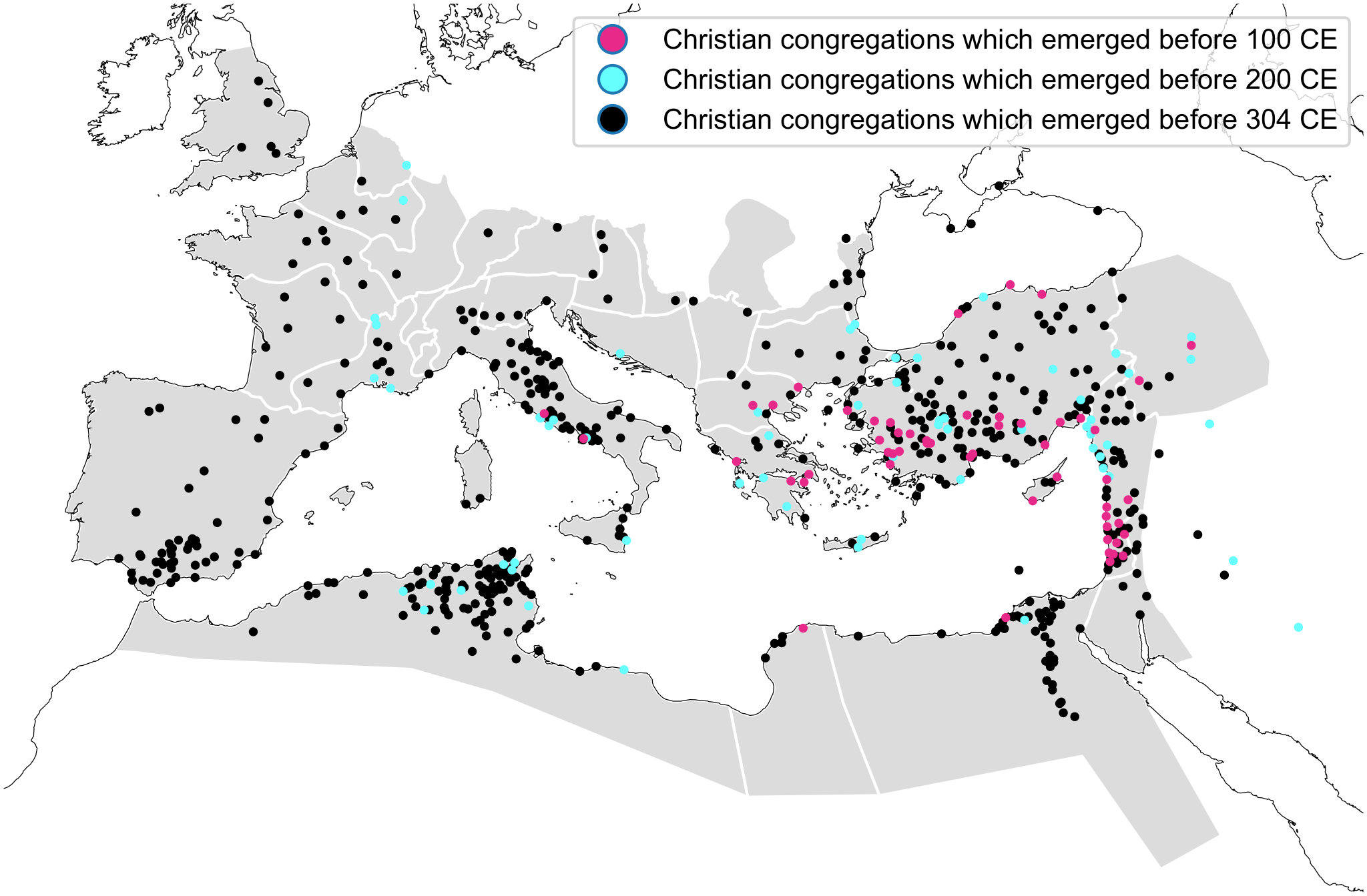
Distribution of Christian congregations in Roman territories during each of the first three centuries CE

While enduring three centuries of on-again, off-again persecution, from differing levels of government ranging from local to imperial, Christianity had remained 'self-organized' and without central authority. In this manner, it reached an important threshold of success between 150 and 250, when it moved from less than 50,000 adherents to over a million, and became self-sustaining and able to generate further growth. There was a significant rise in the absolute number of Christians in the third century.

==== Constantine and the goal of Christianization ====
The Christianization of the Roman Empire is frequently divided by scholars into the two phases of before and after the conversion of Constantine in 312. (Note: There have, historically, been many different scholarly views on Constantine's religious policies. For example Jacob Burckhardt has characterized Constantine as being "essentially unreligious" and as using the Church solely to support his power and ambition. Drake asserts, "critical reaction against Burckhardt's anachronistic reading has been decisive". According to Burckhardt, being Christian automatically meant being intolerant, while Drake says that assumes a uniformity of belief within Christianity that does not exist in the historical record. Brown calls Constantine's conversion a "very Roman conversion". "He had risen to power in a series of deathly civil wars, destroyed the system of divided empire, believed the Christian God had brought him victory, and therefore regarded that god as the proper recipient of religio". Brown says Constantine was over 40, had most likely been a traditional polytheist, and was a savvy and ruthless politician when he declared himself a Christian.) Constantine did not support the suppression of paganism by force. He never engaged in a purge, and there were no pagan martyrs during his reign. Pagans remained in important positions at his court. Constantine ruled for 31 years and despite personal animosity toward paganism, he never outlawed paganism. Making the adoption of Christianity beneficial was Constantine's primary approach to religion, and imperial favor was important to successful Christianization over the next century. Yet, Constantine did not institute many christianizing changes, and those measures he did enact did little to Christianize civic culture.

According to historian Michelle Renee Salzman, there is no evidence to indicate that conversion of pagans through force was an accepted method of Christianization at any point in Late Antiquity. Evidence indicates all uses of imperial force concerning religion were aimed at heretics (who were already Christian) such as the Donatists and the Manichaeans and not at non-believers such as Jews or pagans. (Note: In his 1984 book, Christianizing the Roman Empire: (A.D. 100–400), and again in 1997, Ramsay MacMullen argues that widespread Christian anti–pagan violence, as well as persecution from a "bloodthirsty" and violent Constantine (and his successors), caused the Christianization of the Roman Empire in the fourth century. Salzman describes MacMullen's book as "controversial". In a review of it, T. D. Barnes has written that MacMullen's book treats "non-Christian evidence as better and more reliable than Christian evidence", generalizes from pagan polemics as if they were unchallenged fact, misses important facts entirely, and shows an important selectivity in his choices of what ancient and modern works he discusses. David Bentley Hart also gives a detailed discussion of MacMullen's "careless misuse of textual evidence". Schwarz says MacMullen is an example of a modern minimalist. Schwarz suggests that minimalism is beginning to show signs of decline because it tends to understate the significance of some human actions, and so makes assumptions that are hard to support. As a result, "MacMullen's account of Christianization as basically an aggregation of accidents and contingencies" is not broadly supported. In Gaul, some of the most influential textual sources on pagan-Christian violence concerns Martin, Bishop of Tours (c. 371–397), the Pannonian ex-soldier who is "solely credited in the historical record as the militant converter of Gaul". These texts have been criticized for lacking historical veracity, even by ancient critics, but they are still useful for illuminating views of violence held in late fourth century Gaul. The portion of the sources devoted to attacks on pagans is limited, and they all revolve around Martin using his miraculous powers to overturn pagan shrines and idols, but not to ever threaten or harm people. Salzman concludes "None of Martin's interventions led to the deaths of any Gauls, pagan or Christian. Even if one doubts the exact veracity of these incidents, the assertion that Martin preferred non-violent conversion techniques says much about the norms for conversion in Gaul" at the time Martin's biography was written. Archaeologist David Riggs writes that evidence from North Africa reveals a tolerance of religious pluralism and a vitality of traditional paganism much more than it shows any form of religious violence or coercion: "persuasion, such as the propagation of Christian apologetics, appears to have played a more critical role in the eventual "triumph of Christianity" than was previously assumed". According to Raymond Van Dam, "an approach which emphasizes conflict flounders as a means for explaining both the initial attractions of a new cult like Christianity, as well as, more importantly, its persistence". In the twenty first century, this model of early Christianization has become marginalized.)

However, Constantine must have written the laws that threatened and menaced pagans who continued to practice sacrifice. The element of pagan culture most abhorrent to Christians was sacrifice, and altars used for it were routinely smashed. Christians were deeply offended by the blood of slaughtered victims as they were reminded of their own past sufferings associated with such altars. Richard Lim writes that "Putting an end to blood sacrifice ... thus became the singular goal of Christianization (Barnes 1984; Bradbury 1994, 1995)".

There is no evidence that any of the horrific punishments included in the laws against sacrifice were ever enacted. There is no record of anyone being executed for violating religious laws before Tiberius II Constantine at the end of the sixth century (574–582). Still, Bradbury notes that the complete disappearance of public sacrifice by the mid-fourth century "in many towns and cities must be attributed to the atmosphere created by imperial and episcopal hostility".

==== Christianization with coercion under Justinian I ====
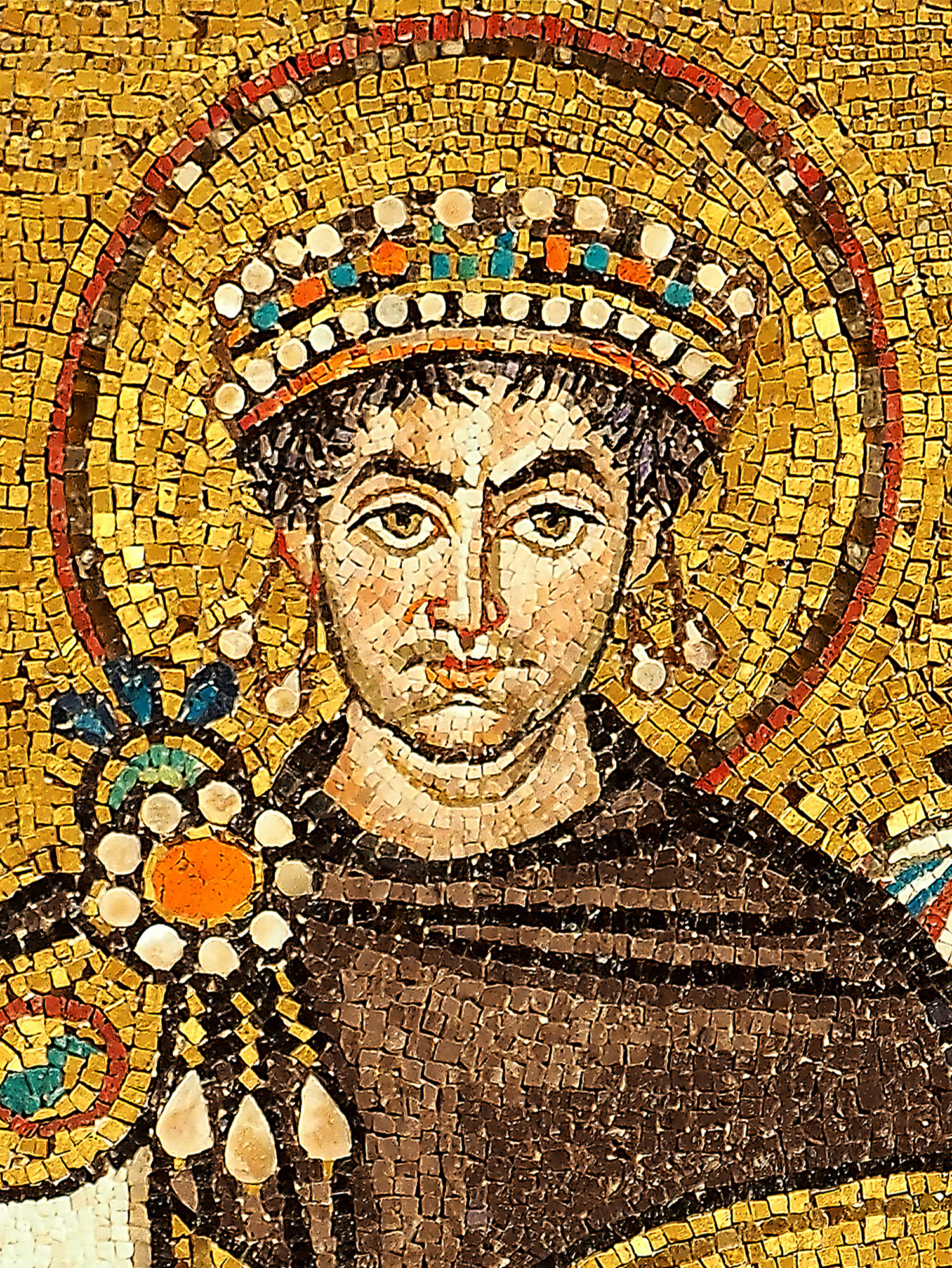
Mosaic of Justinian I in the Basilica San Vitale in Ravenna

The religious policy of the Eastern emperor Justinian I (527 to 565) reflected his conviction that a unified Empire presupposed unity of faith. Justinian's efforts at requiring and enforcing this have led Anthony Kaldellis to write that Justinian is often seen as a tyrant and despot. Unlike Constantine, Justinian did purge the bureaucracy of those who disagreed with him. He sought to centralize imperial government, became increasingly autocratic, and according to the historian Giovanni Mansi, "nothing could be done", not even in the Church, that was contrary to the emperor's will and command. In Kaldellis' estimation, "Few emperors had started so many wars or tried to enforce cultural and religious uniformity with such zeal".

The extent of the Byzantine Empire under Justinian's uncle Justin I is shown in the darker color. The lighter color shows the conquests of his successor, Justinian I also known as Justinian the Great

=== Germanic tribes ===
Christianization spread through the Roman Empire and neighboring empires in the next few centuries, converting most of the Germanic barbarian peoples who would form the ethnic communities that would become the future nations of Europe. The earliest references to the Christianization of these tribes are in the writings of Irenaeus (130–202), Origen (185–253), and Tertullian (Adv. Jud. VII) (155–220).

Tacitus describes the nature of German religion, and their understanding of the function of a king, as facilitating Christianization. Missionaries aimed at converting Germanic nobility first. Ties of fealty between German kings and their followers often produced mass conversions of entire tribes following their king. Afterwards, their societies began a gradual process of Christianization that took centuries, with some traces of earlier beliefs remaining.

In all cases, Christianization meant "the Germanic conquerors lost their native languages. ...[or] the syntax, the conceptual framework underlying the lexicon, and most of the literary forms, were thoroughly latinized".

Saint Boniface led the effort in the mid-eighth century to organize churches in the region that would become modern Germany. As ecclesiastical organization increased, so did the political unity of the Germanic Christians. By the year 962, when Pope John XII anoints King Otto I as Holy Roman Emperor, "Germany and Christendom had become one". This union lasted until dissolved by Napoleon in 1806.

==== Franks ====
The Franks first appear in the historical record in the 3rd century as a confederation of Germanic tribes living on the east bank of the lower Rhine River. Clovis I was the first king of the Franks to unite all of the Frankish tribes under one ruler. The most likely date of his conversion to Catholicism is Christmas Day, 508, following the Battle of Tolbiac. He was baptized in Rheims. The Frankish Kingdom became Christian over the next two centuries. (Note: Grave goods, which of course are not a Christian practice, have been found until that time; see: Padberg (1998), p. 59)

Saxons went back and forth between rebellion and submission to the Franks for decades. Charlemagne (r. 768–814) placed missionaries and courts across Saxony in hopes of pacifying the region, but Saxons rebelled again in 782 with disastrous losses for the Franks. In response, the Frankish King "enacted a variety of draconian measures" beginning with the massacre at Verden in 782 when he ordered the decapitation of 4500 Saxon prisoners offering them baptism as an alternative to death. These events were followed by the severe legislation of the Capitulatio de partibus Saxoniae in 785 which prescribes death to those that are disloyal to the king, harm Christian churches or its ministers, or practice pagan burial rites. His harsh methods of Christianization raised objections from his friends Alcuin and Paulinus of Aquileia. Charlemagne abolished the death penalty for paganism in 797.

=== Ireland ===
Pope Celestine I (422–430) sent Palladius to be the first bishop to the Irish in 431, and in 432, St Patrick began his mission there. Scholars cite many questions (and scarce sources) concerning the next two hundred years. Relying largely on recent archaeological developments, Lorcan Harney has reported to the Royal Academy that the missionaries and traders who came to Ireland in the fifth to sixth centuries were not backed by any military force. Patrick and Palladius and other British and Gaulish missionaries aimed first at converting royal households. Patrick indicates in his Confessio that safety depended upon it. Communities often followed their king en masse.

=== Great Britain ===
Christianity likely reached Britain around 200 with archaeology indicating that it continued as a minority faith into fourth century. Thereafter, Irish missionaries led by Saint Columba, based in Iona (from 563), converted many Picts.

The Christianisation of Anglo-Saxon England began in the late 6th century when the Gregorian mission was launched, leading to the conversion of Æthelberht of Kent around 600. After this, further kings converted such as Eadwine of Deira around 628 and Sigeberht of Essex around 653. Although the traditional religion often regained royal support after the conversion of the first king, Christianity did nonetheless become dominant in England, with the last heathen Anglo-Saxon king Arwald of Wihtwara being killed in battle in 686 and his two sons forcefully baptised and executed. Closely related Nordic forms of paganism were introduced by Scandinavian settlers during the 9th and 10th centuries. Christianity was likely adopted within several generations, with the last potentially heathen king to rule in England being Erik Bloodaxe, who died in 954. Suppression of paganism in England is first recorded as having taken place in the mid 7th century during the reign of Eorcenberht of Kent and continued into the 11th century, with law codes prescribing punishments such as fines, fasting and execution. Not all Germanic cultural elements were suppressed however, with many blending with Christian ones and some continuing in folklore into the modern period.

=== Italy ===
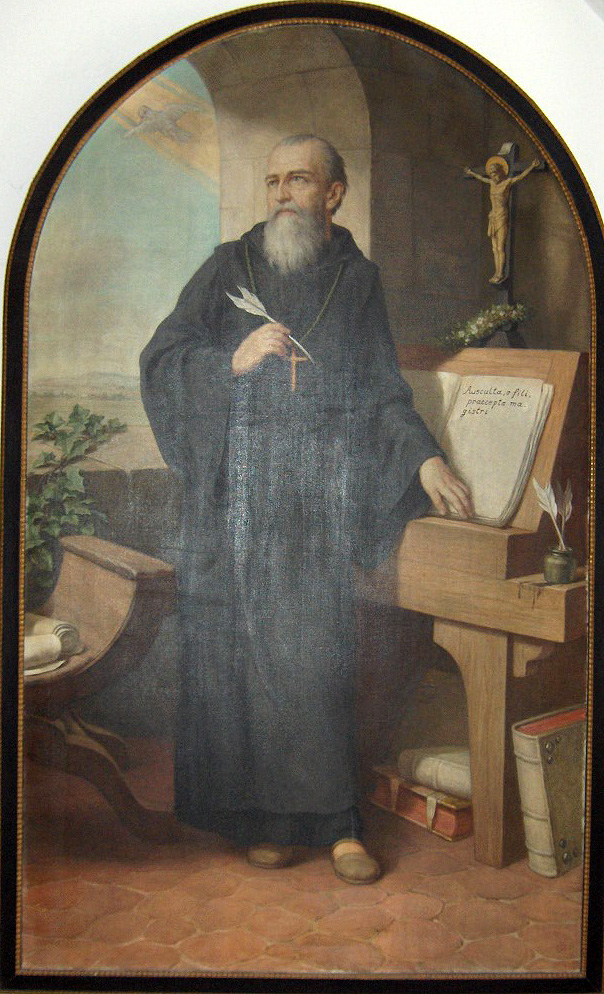
Heiligenkreuz depiction of St. Benedict

Classicist J.H.D. Scourfield writes that Christianization in Italy in Late Antiquity is "most aptly described in terms of negotiation, accommodation, adaptation, [and] transformation". Christianization in Italy allowed for religious competition and cooperation, included syncretism both to and from pagans and Christians, and allowed secularism.

In 529, Benedict of Nursia established his first monastery at Monte Cassino, Italy. He wrote the Rule of Saint Benedict based on "pray and work". This "Rule" provided the foundation of the majority of the thousands of monasteries that spread across the continent of what is now modern day Europe, thereby becoming a major factor in the Christianization of Europe.

=== Greece ===
Christianization was slower in Greece than in most other parts of the Roman empire. There are multiple theories of why, but there is no consensus. What is agreed upon is that, for a variety of reasons, Christianization did not take hold in Greece until the fourth and fifth centuries. Christians and pagans maintained a self imposed segregation throughout the period. Historian and archaeologist Timothy E. Gregory has written in "The Survival of Paganism in Christian Greece: A Critical Essay" that J. M. Speiser successfully argued this was the situation throughout the country, and "rarely was there any significant contact, hostile or otherwise" between Christians and pagans in Greece.

Gregory adds his view that "it is admirably clear that organized paganism survived well into the sixth century throughout the empire and in parts of Greece (at least in the Mani) until the ninth century or later". Pagan ideas and forms persisted most in practices related to healing, death, and the family.

=== Albania ===
Proto-Albanian speakers were Christianized under the Latin sphere of influence, specifically in the 4th century AD, as shown by the basic Christian terms in Albanian, which are of Latin origin and entered Proto-Albanian before the Gheg–Tosk dialectal diversification.

At the time of the South Slavic incursion and the threat of ethnic turbulence in the Albanian-inhabited regions, the Christianization of the Albanians had already been completed and it had apparently developed for Albanians as a further identity-forming feature alongside the ethnic-linguistic unity. Church administration, which was controlled by a thick network of Roman bishoprics, collapsed with the arrival of the Slavs. Between the early 7th century and the late 9th century the interior areas of the Balkans were deprived of church administration, and Christianity might have survived only as a popular tradition on a reduced degree. Some Albanians living in the mountains, who were only partially affected by Romanization, probably sank back into the Classic Paganism.

The reorganization of the Church as a cult institution in the region took a considerable amount of time. The Balkans were brought back into the Christian orbit only after the recovery of the Byzantine Empire and through the activity of Byzantine missionaries. The earliest church vocabulary of Middle Greek origin in Albanian dates to the 8th–9th centuries, at the time of the Byzantine Iconoclasm, which was started by the Byzantine Emperor Leo III the Isaurian. In 726 Leo III established de jure the jurisdiction of the Ecumenical Patriarchate of Constantinople over the Balkans, as the Church and the State established an institution. The Eastern Church expanded its influence in the area along with the social and political developments. Between the 7th and 12th centuries a powerful network of cult institutions were revived completely covering the ecclesiastical administration of the entire present-day Albanian-speaking compact area. In particular an important role was played by the Theme of Dyrrhachium and the Archdiocese of Ohrid. Survived through the centuries, the Christian belief among Albanians became an important cultural element in their ethnic identity. Indeed, the lack of Old Church Slavonic terms in Albanian Christian terminology shows that the missionary activities during the Christianization of the Slavs did not involve Albanian-speakers. In a text compiled around the beginning of the 11th century in the Old Bulgarian language, the Albanians are mentioned for the first time with their old ethnonym Arbanasi as half-believers, a term which for Eastern Orthodox Christian Bulgarians meant Catholic Christian. The Great Schism of 1054 involved Albania separating the region between Catholic Christianity in the north and Orthodox Christianity in the south.

Regardless of the Christianization, ancient paganism persisted among Albanians, and especially within the inaccessible and deep interior – where Albanian folklore evolved over the centuries in a relatively isolated tribal culture and society – it has continued to persist, or at most it was partially transformed by the Christian, and later Muslim and Marxist beliefs, that were either to be introduced by choice or imposed by force. Albanian traditions have been orally transmitted through memory systems that have survived intact into modern times. The Albanian traditional customary law (Kanun) has held a sacred – although secular – longstanding, unwavering and unchallenged authority with a cross-religious effectiveness over the Albanians, which is attributed to an earlier pagan code common to all the Albanian tribes. Historically, the Christian clergy has vigorously fought, but without success, the pagan rituals practiced by Albanians for traditional feasts and particular events, especially the fire rituals (Zjarri).

=== Caucasian Albania ===
Caucasian Albania in 5th and 6th centurires

Most scholars agree that Christianity was officially adopted in Caucasian Albania in AD 313 or AD 315 when Gregory the Illuminator baptized the Albanian king and ordained the first bishop Tovmas, the founder of the Albanian church. It is highly probable that Christianity covered the whole of antique Caucasian Albania by the late fourth century. In his article "About the Dating of the Christianization of Caucasian Albania" historian of the Christian East, Aleksan H. Hakobyan, has written:

The king of the country then was the founder of the Arsacid dynasty of Albania Vachagan I the Brave (but not his grandson Urnayr), and the king of Armenia was Tiridat III the Great, also Arsacid. As M. L. Chaumont established in 1969, the latter, with the help of Gregory the Illuminator, adopted the Christian faith at the state level in June 311, two months after the publication of the Edict of Sardica "On Tolerance" by Emperor Galerius (293–311). In 313, after the appearance of the Edict of Milan, Tiridat attracted the younger allies of Armenia Iberia-Kartli, Albania-Aluank' and Lazika-Egerk' (Colchis) to the process of Christianization. In the first half of 315, Gregory the Illuminator baptized the Albanian king (who had arrived in Armenia) and ordained the first bishop Tovmas (the founder of the Albanian church, with the center in the capital Kapalak) for his country: he was from the city of Satala in Lesser Armenia. Probably, at the same stage, Christianization covered the whole of antique Albania, i.e. territory north of the Kura River, to the Caspian Sea and the Derbend Pass.

=== Armenia, Georgia, Ethiopia and Eritrea ===
In 301, Armenia became the first kingdom in history to adopt Christianity as an official state religion. The transformations taking place in these centuries of the Roman Empire had been slower to catch on in Caucasia. Indigenous writing did not begin until the fifth century, there was an absence of large cities, and many institutions such as monasticism did not exist in Caucasia until the seventh century. Scholarly consensus places the Christianization of the Armenian and Georgian elites in the first half of the fourth century, although Armenian tradition says Christianization began in the first century through the Apostles Thaddeus and Bartholomew. This is said to have eventually led to the conversion of the Arsacid family, (the royal house of Armenia), through St. Gregory the Illuminator in the early fourth century.

Christianization took many generations and was not a uniform process. Byzantine historian Robert Thomson writes that it was not the officially established hierarchy of the church that spread Christianity in Armenia; "It was the unorganized activity of wandering holy men that brought about the Christianization of the populace at large". The most significant stage in this process was the development of a script for the native tongue.

Scholars do not agree on the exact date of Christianization of Georgia, but most assert the early 4th century when Mirian III of the Kingdom of Iberia (known locally as Kartli) adopted Christianity. According to medieval Georgian Chronicles, Christianization began with Andrew the Apostle and culminated in the evangelization of Iberia through the efforts of a captive woman known in Iberian tradition as Saint Nino in the fourth century. Fifth, 8th, and 12th century accounts of the conversion of Georgia reveal how pre-Christian practices were taken up and reinterpreted by Christian narrators.

In 325, the Kingdom of Aksum (Modern Ethiopia and Eritrea) became the second country to declare Christianity as its official state religion.

=== Iberia ===
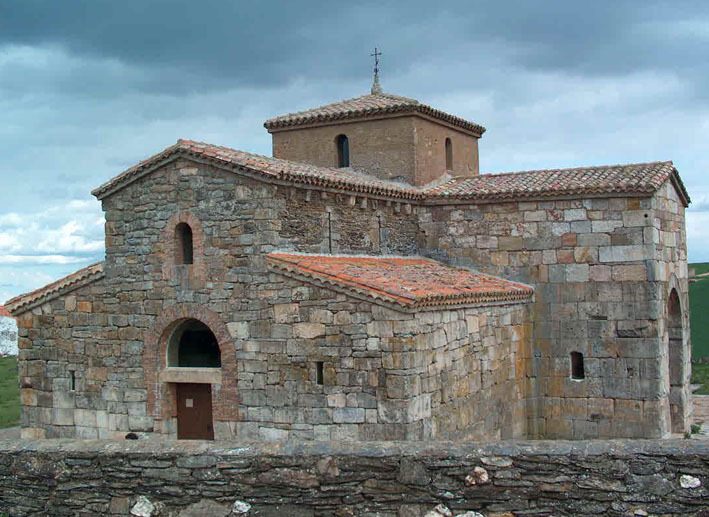
San Pedro de la Nave, one of the oldest churches in Spain

Hispania had become part of the Roman Republic in the third century BC. Christian communities can be found dating to the third century, and bishoprics had been created in León, Mérida and Zaragoza by that same period. In AD 300 an ecclesiastical council held in Elvira was attended by 20 bishops. With the end of persecution in 312, churches, baptistries, hospitals and episcopal palaces were erected in most major towns, and many landed aristocracy embraced the faith and converted sections of their villas into chapels.

In 416, the Germanic Visigoths crossed into Hispania as Roman allies. They converted to Arian Christianity shortly before 429. The Visigothic King Sisebut came to the throne in 612 when the Roman emperor Heraclius surrendered his Spanish holdings. Sisebut banished all Jews who would not submit to baptism. Roman historian Edmund Spenser Bouchier says 90,000 Hebrews were baptized while others fled to France or North Africa. This contradicted the traditional position of the Catholic Church on the Jews, and scholars refer to this shift as a "seismic moment" in Christianization.

=== Europe and Asia of the High and Late Middle Ages (800 to 1500) ===
In Central and Eastern Europe of the 8th and 9th centuries, Christianization was an integral part of the political centralization of the new nations being formed. In Eastern Europe, the combination of Christianization and political centralization created what Peter Brown describes as, "specific micro-Christendoms". Bulgaria, Bohemia (which became Czechoslovakia), the Serbs and the Croats, along with Hungary, and Poland, voluntarily joined the Western, Latin church, sometimes pressuring their people to follow. Full Christianization of the populace often took centuries to accomplish. Conversion began with local elites who wanted to convert because they gained prestige and power through matrimonial alliances and participation in imperial rituals. Christianization then spread from the center to the edges of society.

Historian Ivo Štefan has written, "Although Christian authors often depicted the conversion of rulers as the triumph of the new faith, the reality was much more complex. Christianization of everyday life took centuries, with many non-Christian elements surviving in rural communities until the beginning of the modern era". (Note: Historian Ivo Štefan asserts that, in general, adoption of Christianity in Bohemia, Poland and Hungary was not forced either by pressure from outside or by violence.)

==== Language and literature ====
In the Christianization process of Bohemia, Moravia and Slovakia territories, the two Byzantine missionary brothers Saints Constantine-Cyril and Methodius played the key roles beginning in 863. They spent approximately 40 months in Great Moravia continuously translating texts and teaching students. Cyril developed the first Slavic alphabet and translated the gospel into the Old Church Slavonic language. Old Church Slavonic became the first literary language of the Slavs and, eventually, the educational foundation for all Slavic nations. In 869 Methodius was consecrated as (arch)bishop of Pannonia and the Great Moravia regions.

=== Bulgaria ===
Geographic map of Balkan Peninsula

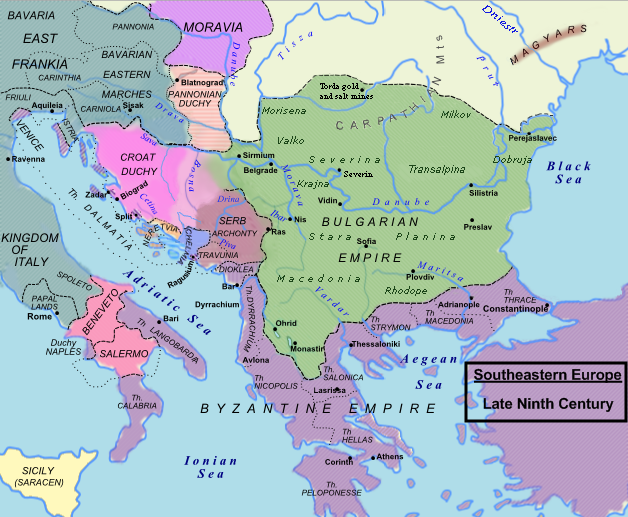
Southeastern Europe Late Ninth Century

Official Christianization began in 864/5 under Khan Boris I (852– 889). Boris I determined that imposing Christianity was the answer to internal peace and external security. The decision was partly military, partly domestic, and partly to diminish the power of the Proto-Bulgarian nobility. A number of nobles reacted violently; 52 were executed. After prolonged negotiations with both Rome and Constantinople, an autocephalous Bulgarian Orthodox Church was formed that used the newly created Cyrillic script to make the Bulgarian language the language of the Church. After a series of victories in wars against the Byzantines led by Symeon (893 to 927), the Byzantines recognized the Bulgarian Patriarchate.

=== Serbia ===
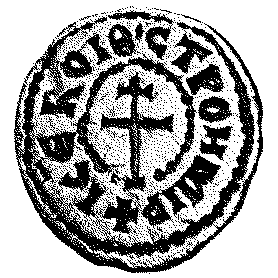
Seal of prince Strojimir of Serbia, from the late 9th century – one of the oldest artifacts of the Christianization of the Serbs

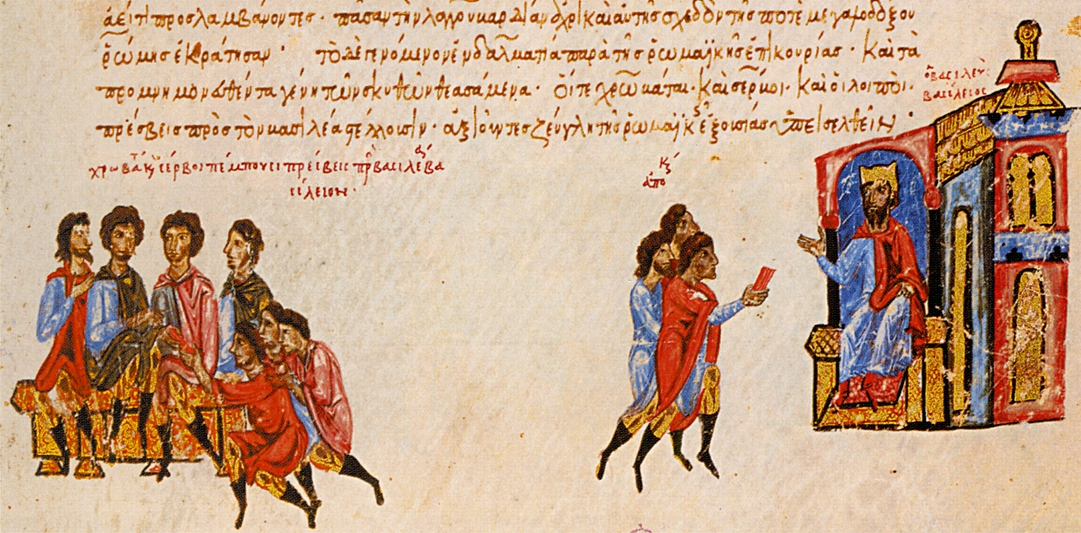
Basil I with delegation of Serbs

The full conversion of the Slavs dates to the time of Eastern Orthodox missionaries Saints Cyril and Methodius during the reign of the Byzantine emperor Basil I (r. 867–886). The first diocese of Serbia, the Diocese of Ras, is mentioned in the ninth century. Serbs were baptized sometime before Basil I, who was asked by the Ragusians for help, sent imperial admiral Nikita Orifas to Knez Mutimir to aid in the war against the Saracens in 869. Serbia can certainly be seen as a Christian nation by 870.

=== Croatia ===
According to Constantine VII, Christianization of Croats began in the 7th century. The conversion of Croatia is said to have been completed by the time of Duke Trpimir's death in 864. In 879, under duke Branimir, Croatia received papal recognition as a state from Pope John VIII. (Note: Hungarian historian László Veszprémy writes: "By the end of the 11th century, Hungarian expansion had secured Croatia, a country that was coveted by both the Venetian and Byzantine empires and had already adopted the Latin Christian faith. The Croatian crown was held by the Hungarian kings up to 1918, but Croatia retained its territorial integrity throughout. It is not unrelated that the borders of Latin Christendom in the Balkans have remained coincident with the borders of Croatia into present times".)

=== Bohemia/Czech lands ===
What was Bohemia forms much of the Czech Republic, comprising the central and western portions of the country.

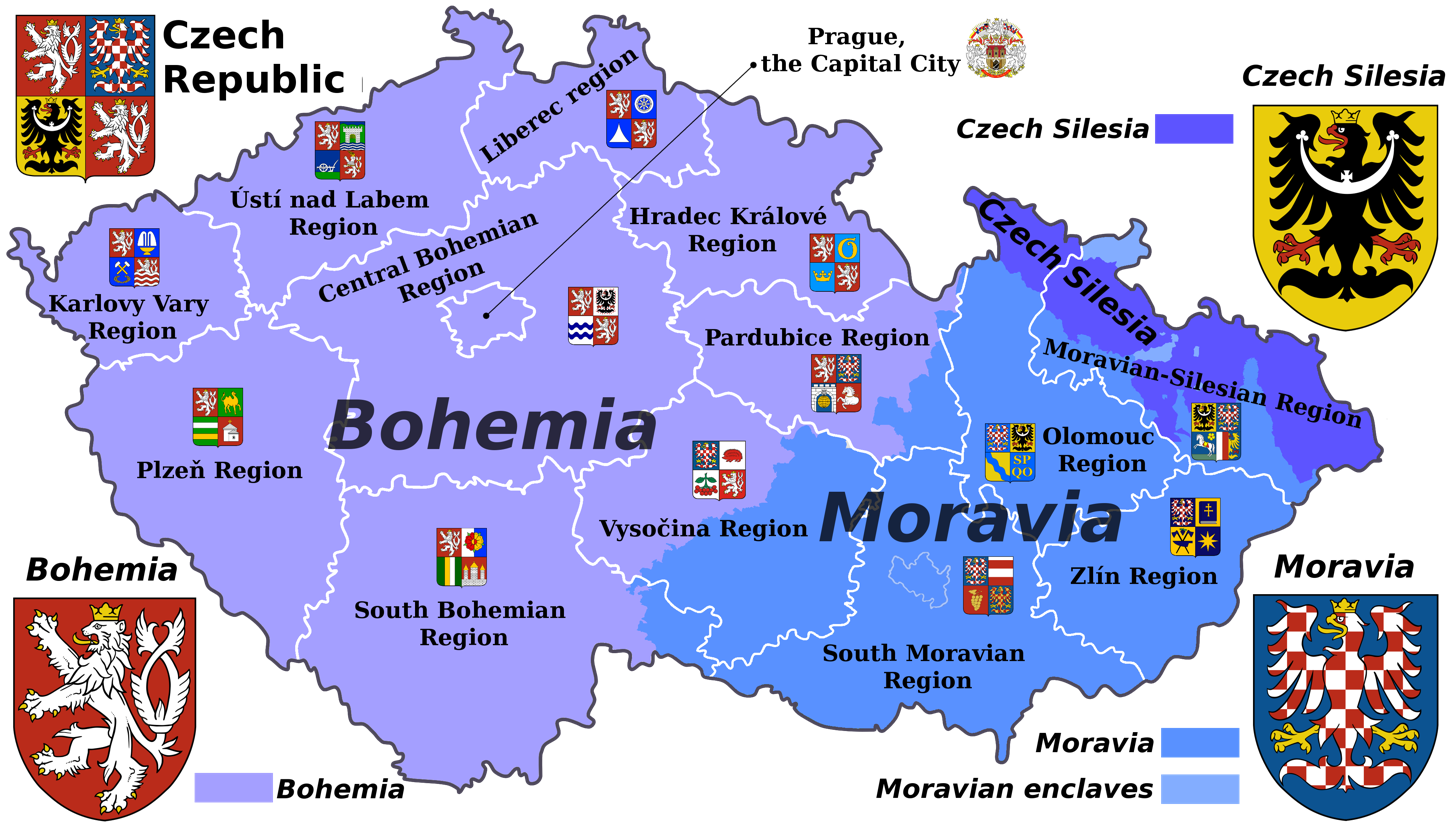
Czech Republic – Bohemia, Moravia and Silesia IV (en)

Significant missionary activity only took place after Charlemagne defeated the Avar Khaganate several times at the end of the 8th century and beginning of the ninth centuries. The first Christian church of the Western and Eastern Slavs (known to written sources) was built in 828 by Pribina (c. 800–861) ruler and Prince of the Principality of Nitra. In 880, Pope John VIII issued the bull Industriae Tuae, by which he set up the independent ecclesiastical province with Archbishop Methodius as its head. Relics withstood the fall of Great Moravia.

=== Poland ===
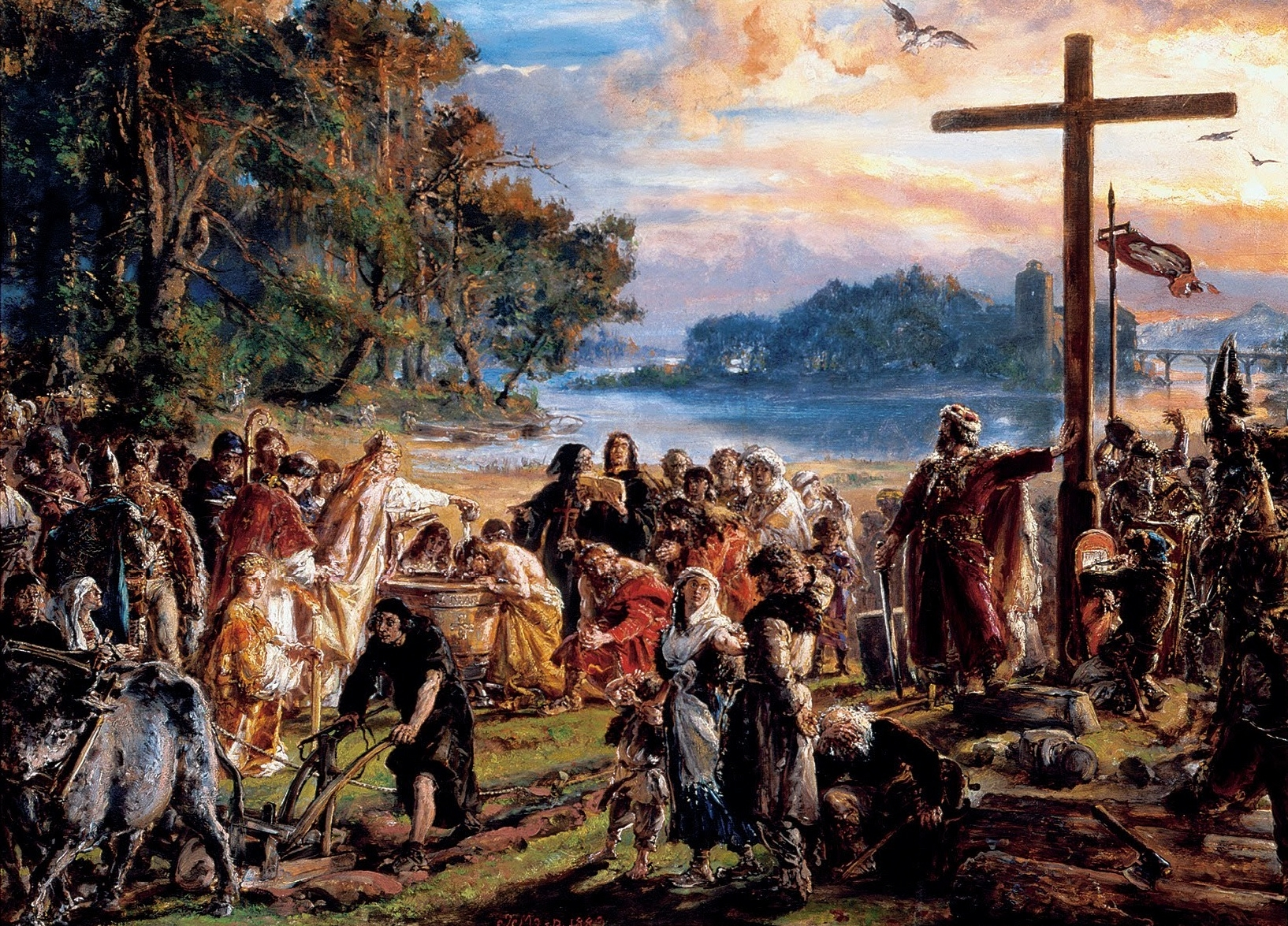
Introduction of Christianity in Poland, by Jan Matejko, 1888–89, National Museum, Warsaw

According to historians Franciszek Longchamps de Bérier and Rafael Domingo: "A pre-Christian Poland never existed. Poland entered history suddenly when some western lands inhabited by the Slavs embraced Christianity". The dynastic interests of the Piasts produced the establishment of both church and state in Great Poland (Greater Poland, also known as "Wielkopolska" in Polish, is a historical region of west-central Poland. Its chief and largest city is Poznań.). The "Baptism of Poland" (Polish: Chrzest Polski) in 966, refers to the baptism of Mieszko I, the first ruler. Mieszko's baptism was followed by the building of churches and the establishment of an ecclesiastical hierarchy. Mieszko saw baptism as a way of strengthening his hold on power, with the active support he could expect from the bishops, as well as a unifying force for the Polish people.

=== Hungary ===
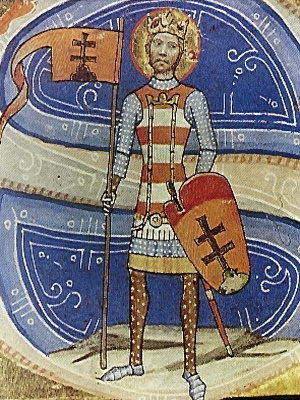
Image of the King Saint Stephen I of Hungary, from the medieval codex Chronicon Pictum from the 14th century

Around 952, the tribal chief Gyula II of Transylvania, visited Constantinople and was baptized, bringing home with him Hierotheus who was designated bishop of Turkia (Hungary). The conversion of Gyula at Constantinople and the missionary work of Bishop Hierotheus are depicted as leading directly to the court of St. Stephen, the first Hungarian king, a Christian in a still mostly pagan country.

Stephen suppressed rebellion, organized both the Hungarian State (with strong royal authority), and the church, by inviting missionaries, and suppressing paganism by making laws such as requiring people to attend church every Sunday. Soon the Hungarian Kingdom had two archbishops and 8 bishops, and a defined state structure with province governors that answered to the King. Saint Stephen was the first Hungarian monarch elevated to sainthood for his Christian characteristics and not because he suffered a martyr's death. Hungarian Christianity and the kingdom's ecclesiastical and temporal administrations consolidated towards the end of the 11th century.

=== Scandinavia (Sweden, Norway, Denmark, and Iceland) ===
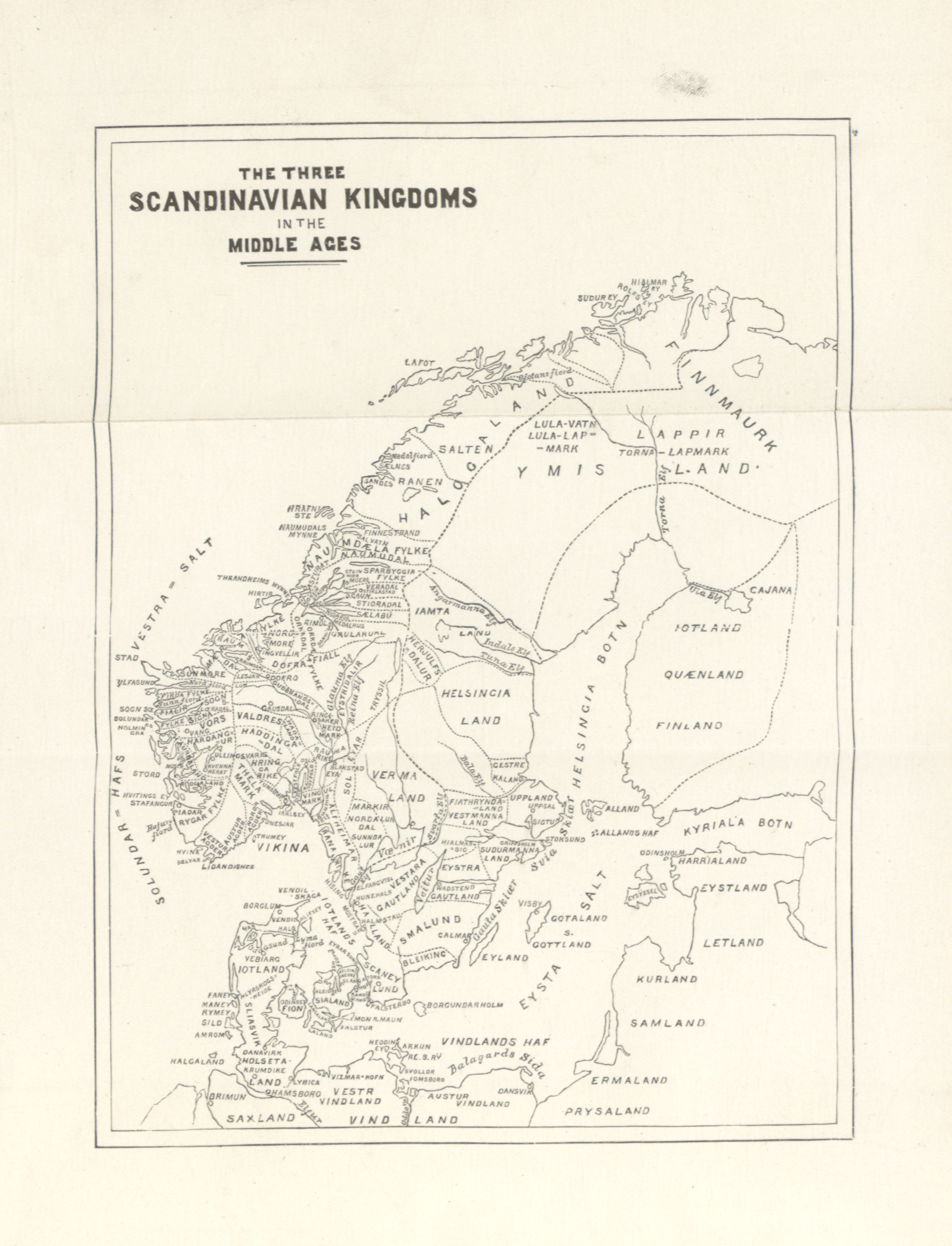
34 of 'The History of Norway. (With maps.)' (11184806384)

Christianization of Scandinavia is divided into two stages by Professor of medieval archaeology Alexandra Sanmark. Stage 1 involves missionaries who arrived in pagan territory in the 800s, on their own, without secular support. Historian Florence Harmer writes "Between A.D. 960 and 1008 three Scandinavian kings were converted to Christianity". The Danish King Harald Gormsen (Bluetooth) was baptized c. 960. The conversion of Norway was begun by Hákon Aðalsteinsfostri between 935 and 961, but the wide-scale conversion of this kingdom was undertaken by King Olaf Tryggvason in c. 995. In Sweden, King Olof Erikson Skötkonung accepted Christianity around 1000.

According to Peter Brown, Scandinavians adopted Christianity of their own accord c.1000. Anders Winroth explains that Iceland became the model for the institutional conversion of the rest of Scandinavia after AD 1000. Winroth demonstrates that Scandinavians were not passive recipients of the new religion, but converted to Christianity because it was in their political, economic, and cultural interests to do so.

Stage 2 began when a secular ruler took charge of Christianization in their territory, and ended when a defined and organized ecclesiastical network was established. By 1350, Scandinavia was an integral part of Western Christendom.

=== Romania ===
In the last two decades of the 9th century, missionaries Clement and Naum, (who were disciples of the brothers Cyril and Methodius), had arrived in the region spreading the Cyrillic alphabet. By the 10th century when the Bulgarian Tsars extended their territory to include Transylvania, they were able to impose the Bulgarian church model and its Slavic language without opposition. Nearly all Romanian words concerning Christian faith have Latin roots (from the early centuries of Roman occupation), while words regarding the organization of the church are Slavonic.

Romanian historian Ioan-Aurel Pop writes "Christian fervor and the massive conversion to Christianity among the Slavs may have led to the canonic conversion of the last heathen, or ecclesiastically unorganized, Romanian islands". For Romanians, the church model was "overwhelming, omnipresent, putting pressure on the Romanians and often accompanied by a political element". This ecclesiastical and political tradition continued until the 19th century.

=== Northern Crusades ===
Baltic Tribes c 1200

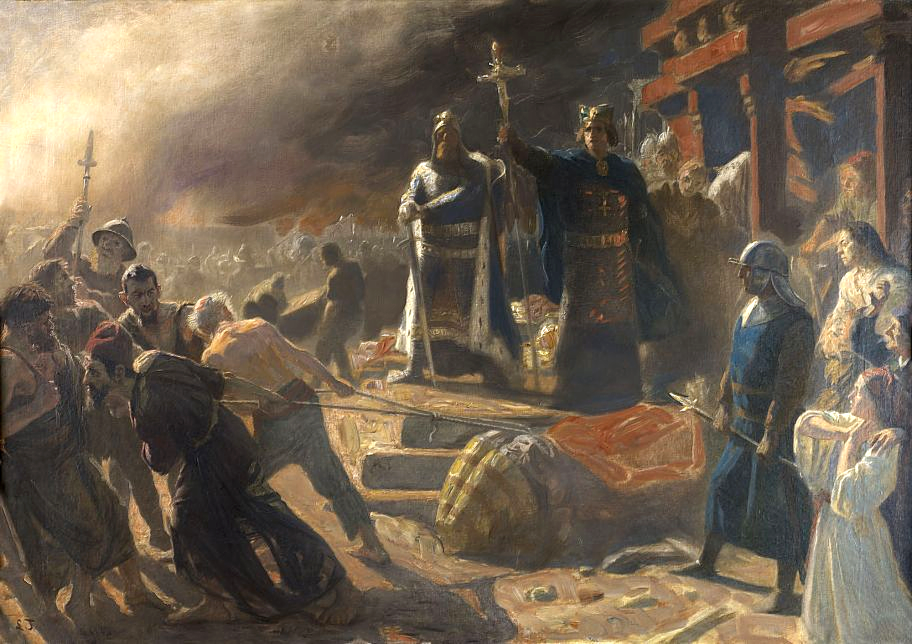
Danish Bishop Absalon destroys the idol of Slavic god Svantevit at Arkona in a painting by Laurits Tuxen

From before the days of Charlemagne (747–814), the fierce pagan tribes east of the Baltic Sea lived on the physical frontiers of Christendom in what has today become Estonia, Latvia, Lithuania and the Kaliningrad oblast (Prussia). They survived largely by raiding – stealing crucial resources, killing, and enslaving captives – from the countries that surrounded them including Denmark, Prussia, Germany and Poland.

One result of the northern crusades, according to historian Aiden Lilienfeld, was that: "[ . . . ] The conquering forces of the Northern Crusades brought more territory under German control than nearly any other concerted expansion in the history of the Holy Roman Empire"—emphasizing that duty to the faith could often go hand-in-hand, from the perspective of prospective crusaders, with political and material benefit.

Combining their personal priorities with a need to permanently stop the raiding, they requested permission to subdue the Baltic instead. In 1147, Eugenius' Divini dispensatione, gave the eastern nobles full crusade indulgences to do so. The Northern, (or Baltic), Crusades followed, taking place, off and on, with and without papal support, from 1147 to 1316.

Acquisition of territory and wealth was a major aim—perhaps the major aim—in undertaking military action, on the part of the Christian rulers west of the Oder, and clerics such as Helmond of Bosau complained that the nobles' demands for tribute hindered the process of conversion; on the other hand, the Christianization of the locals—and the putative rewards in the hereafter to ensue from its success—was a powerful motivator as well. In some cases, voluntary conversion of the local aristocracy—usually followed by the populace, under this influence—was recognized, and stayed the hand of war; in others, naked ambition and greed for material wealth resulted in military actions against ostensibly already-converted peoples. In most cases, conversion was ultimately the result of conquest.

According to Fonnesberg-Schmidt: "While the theologians maintained that conversion should be voluntary, there was a widespread pragmatic acceptance of conversion obtained through political pressure or military coercion". There were often severe consequences for populations that chose to resist, though in some instances local rulers were able to successfully plead a case for withholding attempts at the forcible Christianization of the populace—both ruler and crusaders cognizant of the risk of armed rebellion (and hence disruption of profitable trade or tribute), were such attempts to proceed.

=== Lithuania ===
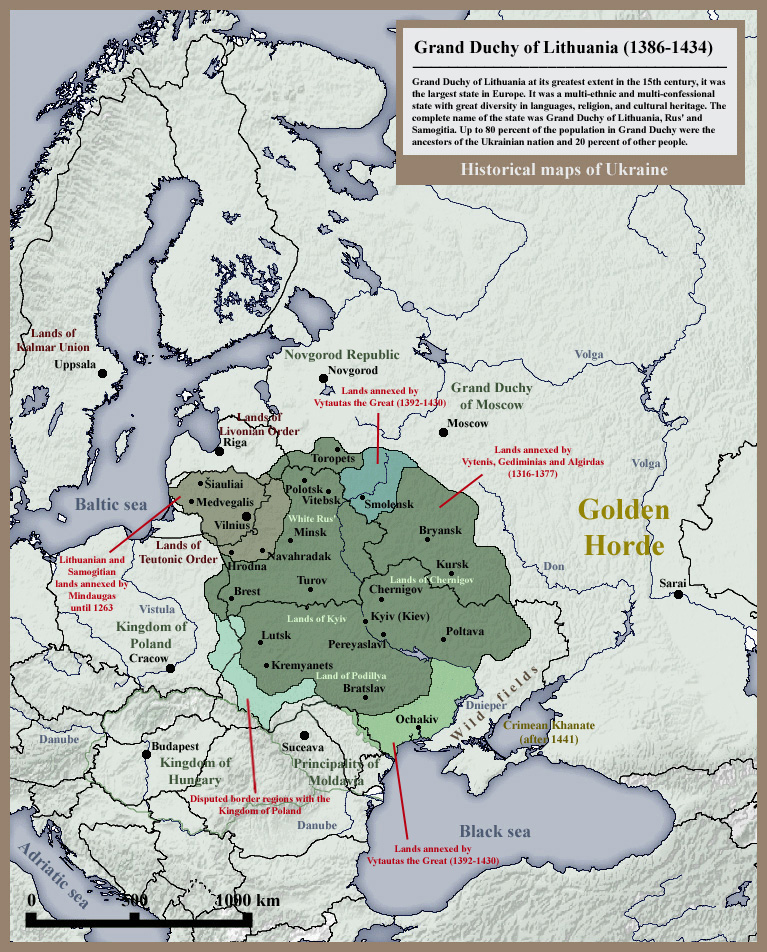
Grand Duchy of Lithuania Rus and Samogitia 1434

The last of the Baltic crusades was the conflict between the mostly German Teutonic Order and Lithuania in the far northeastern reaches of Europe. Lithuania is sometimes described as "the last pagan nation in medieval Europe".

The Teutonic Order was a mostly German crusading organization from the Christian Holy Land founded by members of the Knights Hospitaller. Medieval historian Aiden Lilienfeld says "In 1226, however, the Duke of Mazovia ... granted the Order territory in eastern Prussia in exchange for help in subjugating pagan Baltic peoples". Over the course of the next 200 years, the Order expanded its territory to cover much of the eastern Baltic coast.

In 1384, Jadwiga, the ten year old daughter of Louis the Great, King of Hungary and Poland and his wife Elizabeth of Bosnia, was crowned king of Poland. One year later, a marriage was arranged between her and the Grand Duke Jogaila of Lithuania. Duke Jogaila was baptized, married, and crowned king in 1386, thus beginning the 400 year shared history of Poland and Lithuania. This would seem to obviate the need for religious crusade, yet activity against local populations, particularly the Samogitian peoples of the eastern Baltic, continued in a frequently brutal manner.

The Teutonic Order eventually fell to Poland-Lithuania in 1525. Lilienfeld says "After this, the Order's territory was divided between Poland-Lithuania and the Hohenzollern dynasty of Brandenburg, putting an end to the monastic state and the formal Northern Crusade. All of the Order's most powerful cities–Danzig (Gdansk), Elbing (Elblag), Marienburg (Malbork), and Braunsberg (Braniewo)–now fall within Poland in the 21st century, except for Koenigsburg (Kaliningrad) in Russia."

=== Kievan Rus' ===
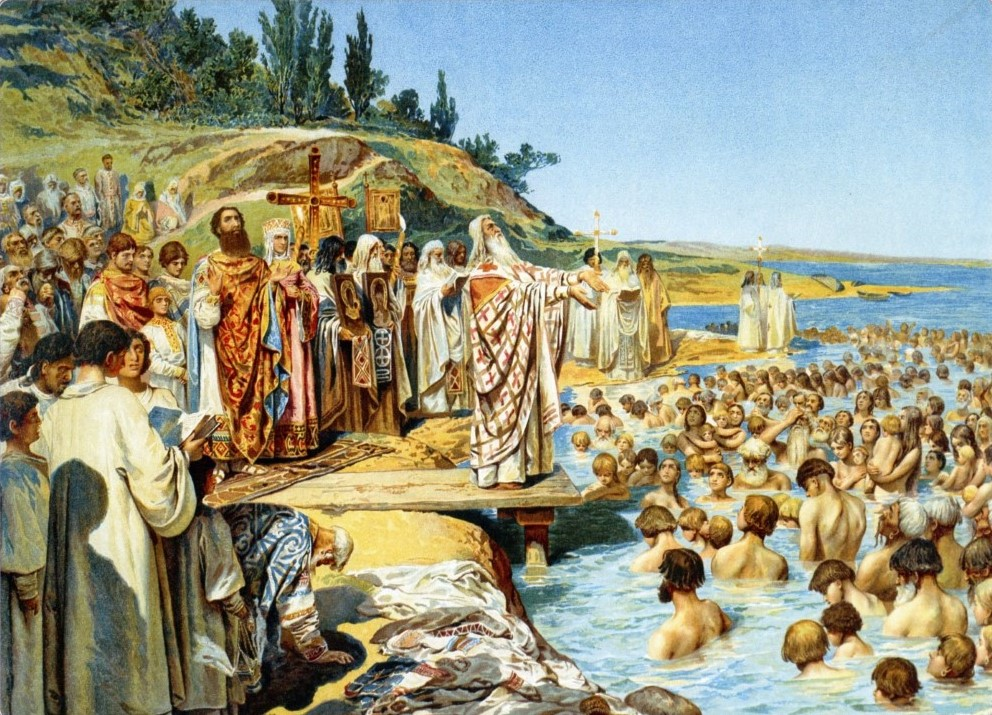
The Baptism of Kievans, a painting by Klavdiy Lebedev

Around 978, Vladimir (978–1015), the son of Sviatoslav, seized power in Kiev. Slavic historian Ivo Štefan writes that, Vladimir examined monotheism for himself, and "Around that same time, Vladimir conquered Cherson in the Crimea, where, according to the Tale of Bygone Years, he was baptized". After returning to Kiev, the same text describes Vladimir as unleashing "a systematic destruction of pagan idols and the construction of Christian churches in their place".

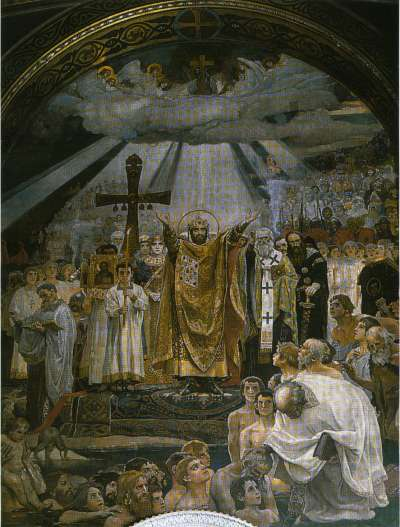
The Baptism of Kievans, a fresco by Viktor Vasnetsov

Bohemia, Poland, and Hungary had become part of western Latin Christianity, while the Rus' adopted Christianity from Byzantium, leading them down a different path. A specific form of Rus' Christianity formed quickly.

The Rus' dukes maintained exclusive control of the church which was financially dependent upon them. The prince appointed the clergy to positions in government service; satisfied their material needs; determined who would fill the higher ecclesiastical positions; and directed the synods of bishops in the Kievan metropolitanate. This new Christian religious structure was imposed upon the socio-political and economic fabric of the land by the authority of the state's rulers. According to Andrzej Poppe, Slavic historian, it is fully justifiable to call the Church of Rus' a state church. The Church strengthened the authority of the Prince, and helped to justifiy the expansion of Kievan empire into new territories through missionary activity.

Christian clergy translated religious texts into local vernacular language which introduced literacy to all members of the princely dynasty, including women and the general populace. Monasteries of the twelfth century became key spiritual, intellectual, art, and craft centers. Under Vladimir's son Yaroslav I the Wise (1016–1018, 1019–1054), a building and cultural boom took place. The Church of Rus' gradually developed into an independent political force in the twelfth and thirteenth centuries.

=== Finland ===
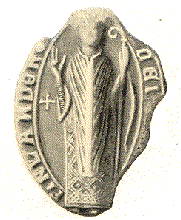
Seal of Bishop Bero of Finland from 1253.

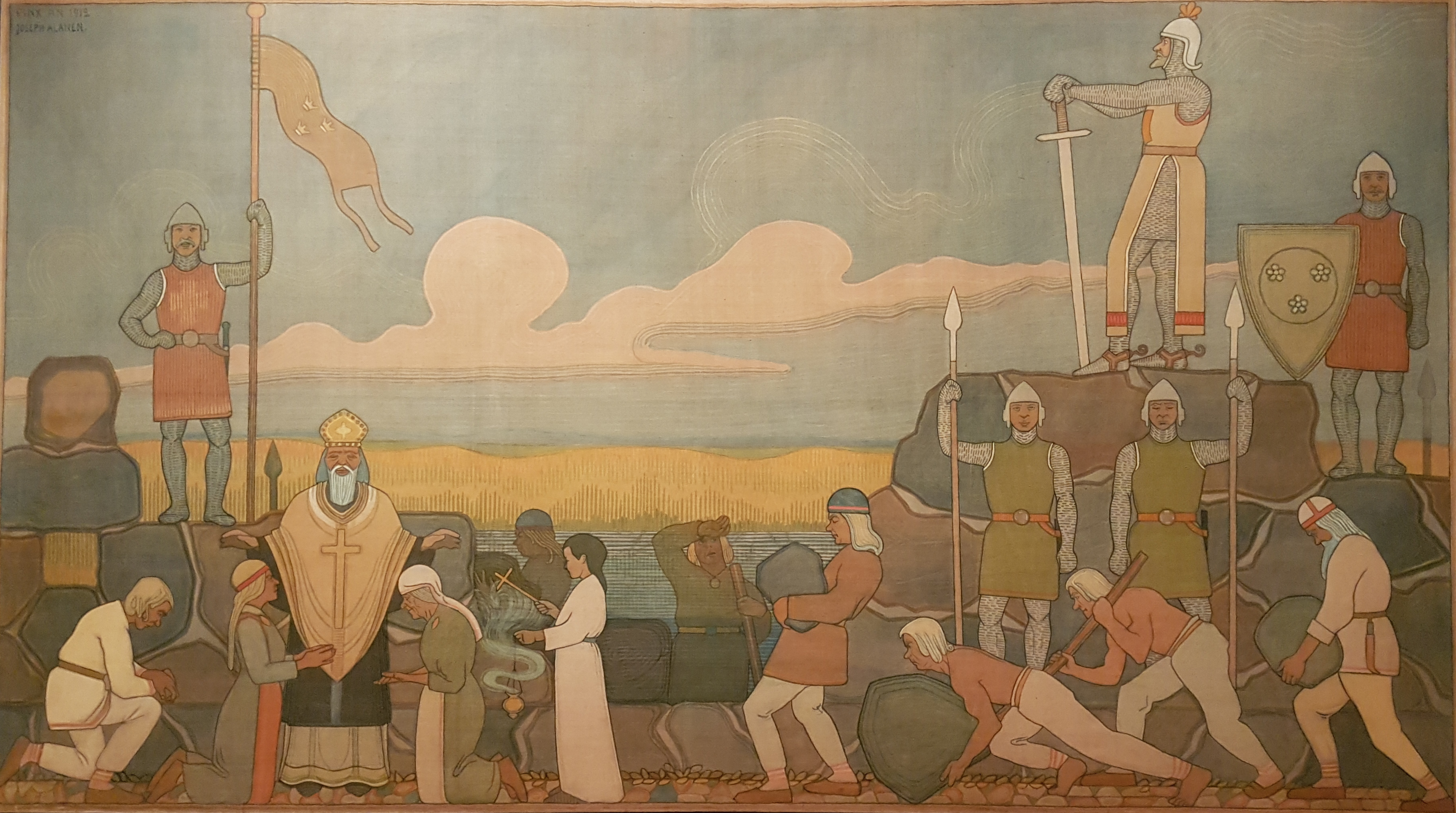
Imagery collage of Birger Jarl conquering Häme and the construction of Häme Castle

According to the archaeological finds, Christianity gained a foothold in Finland during the 11th century. According to the very few written documents that have survived, the church in Finland was still in its early development in the 12th century. Later medieval legends from late 13th century describe Swedish attempts to conquer and Christianize Finland sometime in the mid-1150s. Danish troops raided the Finnish coastline several times between 1191 and 1202. The Finnish tribes were able to wage war and engage in trade, but over time, were increasingly drawn into Latin Christendom. The Catholic church was strengthened with growing Swedish influence in the 12th century and the Finnish "crusade" of Birger Jarl in the 13th century.

In the early 13th century, Bishop Thomas became the first known bishop of Finland. There were several secular powers who aimed to bring the Finnish tribes under their rule. These were Sweden, Denmark, the Republic of Novgorod in northwestern Russia, and probably the German crusading orders as well. Finns had their own chiefs, but most probably no central authority. At the time there can be seen three cultural areas or tribes in Finland: Finns, Tavastians and Karelians. Russian chronicles indicate there were several conflicts between Novgorod and the Finnic tribes from the 11th or 12th century to the early 13th century. The influence of Russian Orthodoxy was extended to the area around Lake Onega and Lake Ladoga and the Häme (Tavastians) there were converted.

=== Iberian Reconquista ===
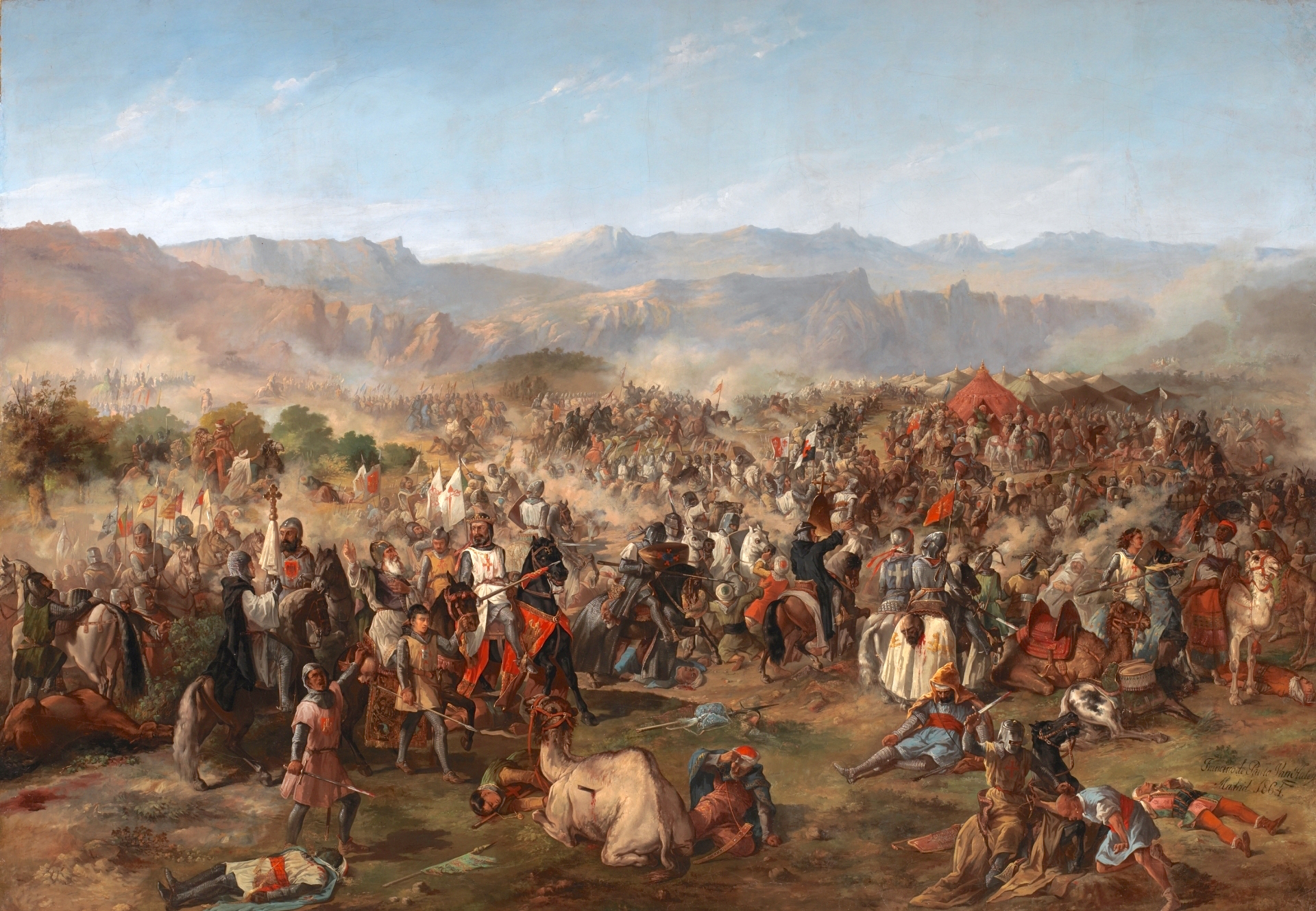
Depiction of the Battle of Navas de Tolosa by 19th-century painter Francisco de Paula Van Halen

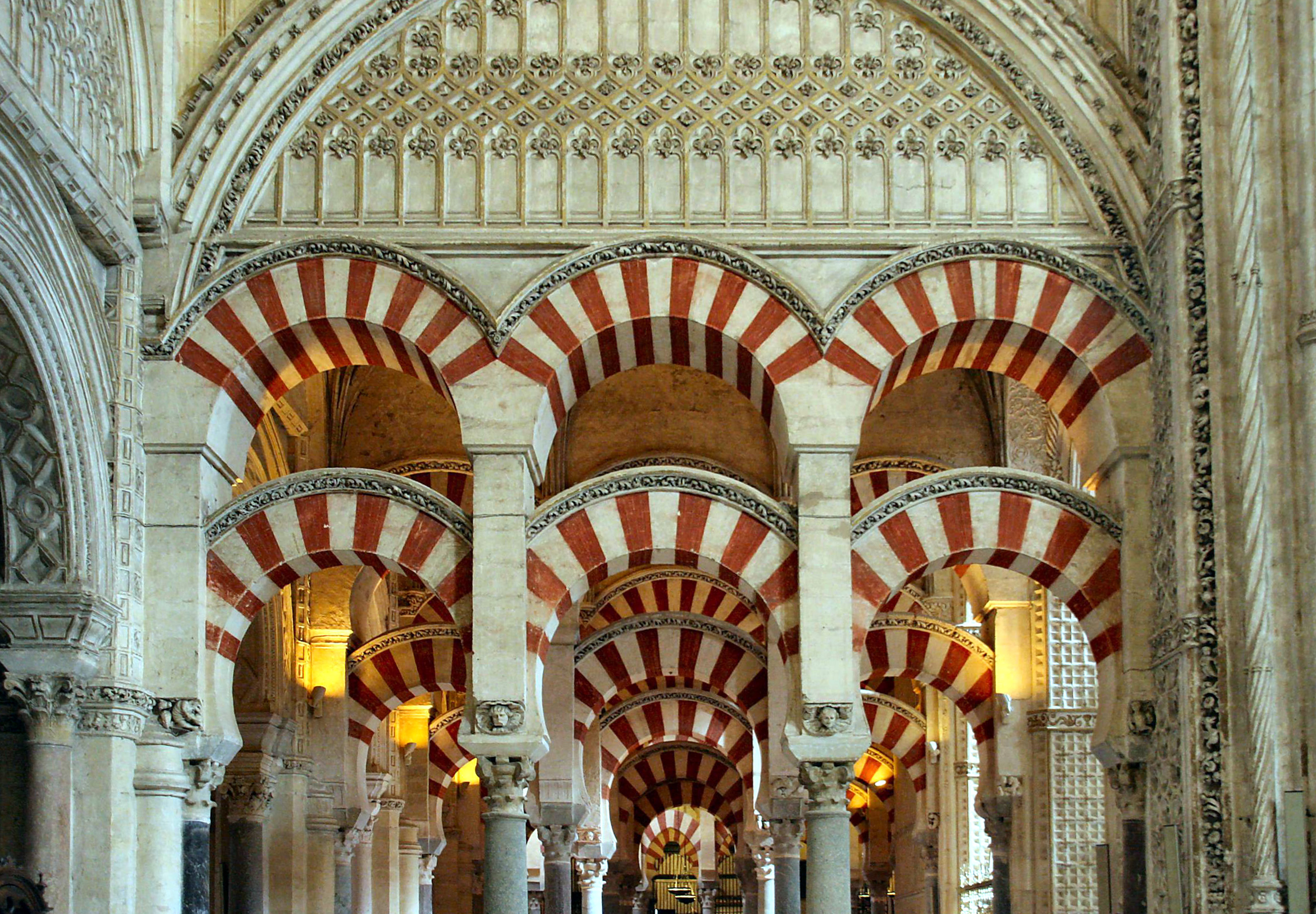
The Mosque–Cathedral of Córdoba is an example of the physical Christianization of Muslim spaces following medieval Catholic conquests in Iberia.

Between 711 and 718, the Iberian Peninsula had been conquered by Muslims in the Umayyad conquest. The centuries long military struggle to reclaim the peninsula from Muslim rule, called the Reconquista, took place until the Christian Kingdoms, that would later become Spain and Portugal, reconquered the Moorish Al-Ándalus in 1492. (The Battle of Covadonga in 722 is seen as the beginning of Reconquista and the annexation of Grenada in 1492 is its end).

Isabel and Ferdinand married in October 1469 thereby uniting Spain with themselves as its first royalty. In 1478, they established the Spanish Inquisition, telling the Pope it was needed to find heretics – specifically Jews pretending to be Christian so they could spy for Moslems who wanted their territory back. In actuality, it served state interests and consolidated power in the monarchy. The Spanish inquisition was originally authorized by the Pope, yet the initial inquisitors proved so severe that the Pope almost immediately opposed it and attempted to shut it down without success. Ferdinand is said to have pressured the Pope, and in October 1483, a papal bull conceded control of the inquisition to the Spanish crown. According to Spanish historian José Casanova, the Spanish inquisition became the first truly national, unified and centralized state institution.

== Early colonialism (1500s–1700s) ==
Following the geographic discoveries of the 1400s and 1500s, increasing population and inflation led the emerging nation-states of Portugal, Spain, and France, the Dutch Republic, and England to explore, conquer, colonize and exploit the newly discovered territories. While colonialism was primarily economic and political, it opened the door for Christian missionaries who accompanied the early explorers, or soon followed them, thereby connecting Christianization and colonialism.

History also connects Christianization with opposition to colonialism. Historian Lamin Sanneh writes that there is an equal amount of evidence of both missionary support and missionary opposition to colonialism through "protest and resistance both in the church and in politics". In Sanneh's view, missions were "colonialism's Achilles' heel, not its shield". He goes on to explain this is because, "Despite their role as allies of the empire, missions also developed the vernacular that inspired sentiments of national identity and thus undercut Christianity's identification with colonial rule". According to historical theologian Justo Gonzales, colonialism and missions each sometimes aided and sometimes impeded the other.

Different state actors created colonies that varied widely. Some colonies had institutions that allowed native populations to reap some benefits. Others became extractive colonies with predatory rule that produced an autocracy with a dismal record.

=== Disease ===
A catastrophe was wrought upon the Amerindians by contact with Europeans. Old World diseases like smallpox, measles, malaria and many others spread through Indian populations. Historian Barry Strauss and the coauthors of "Western Civilization The Continuing Experiment", have stated that, "In most of the New World, 90 percent or more of the native population was destroyed by wave after wave of previously unknown afflictions. Explorers and colonists did not enter an empty land but rather an emptied one".

=== Spanish and Portuguese India, Mexico, the Americas, and the Philippines ===
Portugal practiced extractive colonialism, and was the first to get involved in the pre-existing slave trade. Historian Kenneth Morgan writes that, "the Portuguese and the Spanish dominated the early phase of transatlantic slavery".

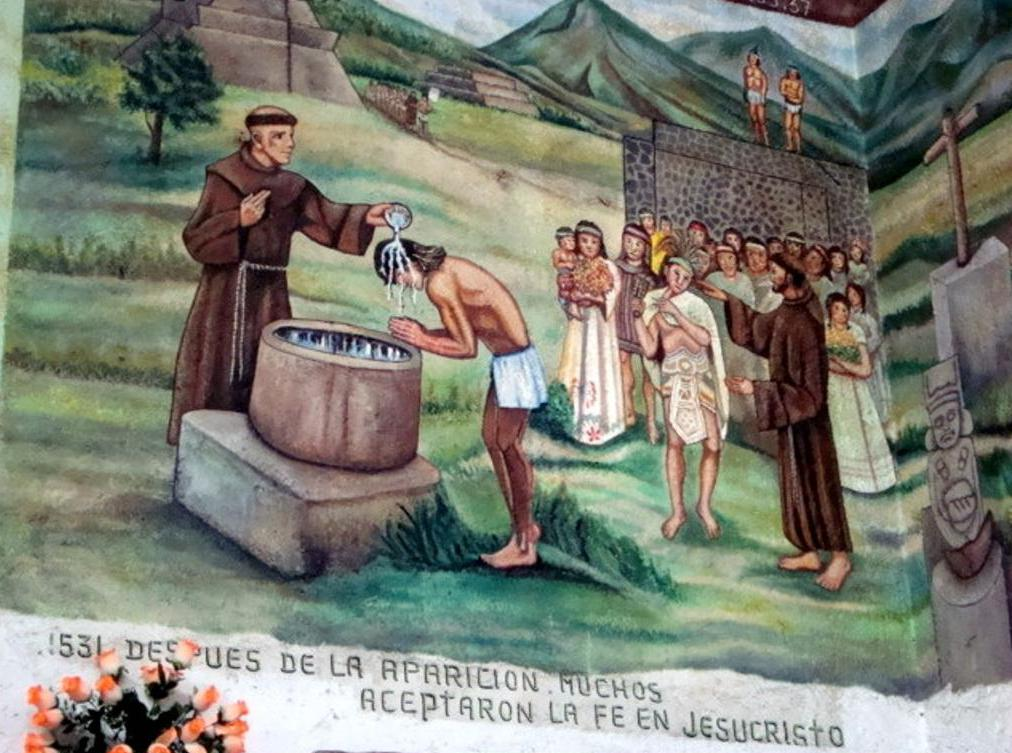
Evangelization of Mexico

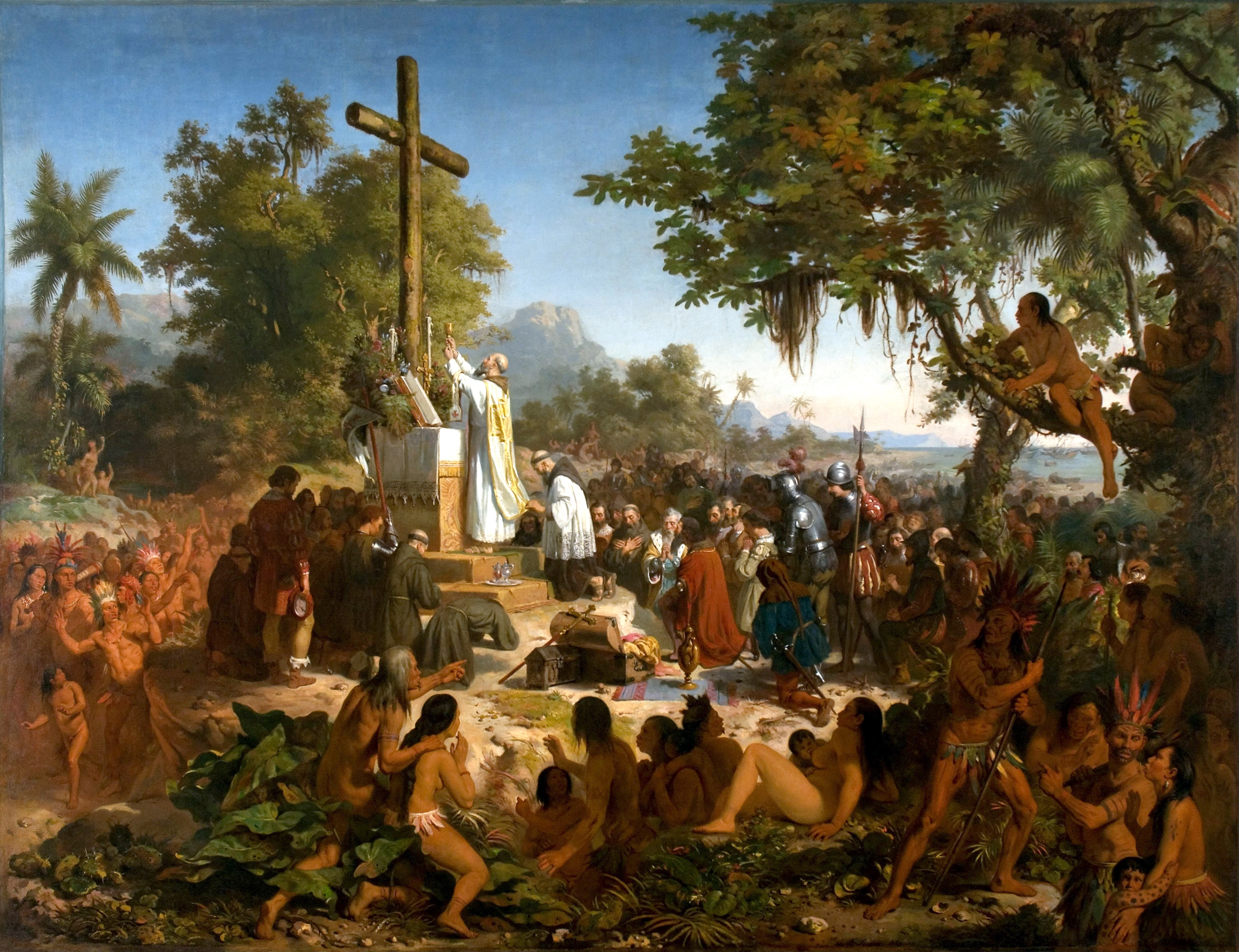
"First Mass in Brazil". painting by Victor Meirelles

Under Spanish and Portuguese rule, creating a Christian Commonwealth was the goal of missions. This included a significant role, from the beginning of colonial rule, played by Catholic missionaries.

Early attempts at Christianization in India were not very successful, and those who had been converted were not well instructed. In the church's view, this led them into "errors and misunderstandings" that were often defined as heresy. In December 1560, the state controlled Portuguese Inquisition arrived in Goa, India. This was largely the result of the crown's fear that converted Jews were becoming dominant in Goa and might ally with Ottoman Jews to threaten Portuguese control of the spice trade. After 1561, the Inquisition had a practical monopoly over heresy, and its "policy of terror ... was reflected in the approximately 15,000 trials which took place between 1561 and 1812, involving more than 200 death sentences".

Spanish missionaries are generally credited with championing efforts to initiate protective laws for the Indians and for working against their enslavement. This led to debate on the nature of human rights. In 16th-century Spain, the issue resulted in a crisis of conscience and the birth of modern international law. Jesuit opposition to the enslavement of native Amerindians inadvertently contributed to the proliferation of black African slaves in their place.

In words of outrage, Junipero Serra wrote of the depredations of the soldiers against Indian women in California in 1770. Following through on missionary complaints, Viceroy Bucareli drew up the first regulatory code of California, the Echeveste Regulations. Missionary opposition and military prosecution failed to protect the Amerindian women. On the one hand, California missionaries sought to protect the Amerindians from exploitation by the conquistadores, the ordinary soldiers and the colonists. On the other hand, Jesuits, Franciscans and other orders relied on corporal punishment and an institutionalized racialism for training the "untamed savages".

=== French Canada, North America, Africa, Indochina and the West Indies ===
In the seventeenth century, the French used assimilation as a means of establishing colonies controlled by the nation-state rather than private companies. Referred to as the "Civilizing Mission", the goal was a political and religious community representative of an ideal society as articulated through the progressive theory of history. This common theory of the time asserts that history shows the normal progression of society is toward constant betterment; that humans could therefore eventually be perfected; that primitive nations could be forced to become modern states wherein that would happen. The French advocated multiple aspects of European culture such as "civility, social organization, law, economic development, civil status", as well as European dress, bodily description, religion, and more, excluding and replacing local culture as the means to this end. Dutch historian Henk Wesseling describes this as "... turning the coloured peoples – by means of education – into coloured Frenchmen".

=== Dutch Indonesia, South Africa, Curaçao, New Guinea ===
The Dutch Reformed church was not a dominant influence in the Dutch colonies. However, the Dutch East Indies Trading Company was a dominant force; it became a monopoly with government support as a merchant company, a military power, a government, and even an agricultural producer. Dutch imperialism began with a military takeover of the Bandanese island of Pulau Ay in 1615, which was followed by more military action, forced relocation (and forced mobilization), slavery, the slave trade which defined people as property like crops, and other forms of coerced labor.

=== British North America, Australia, New Zealand, Asia and Africa ===
Colonies in the Americas experienced a distinct type of colonialism called settler colonialism that replaces indigenous populations with a settler society. Settler colonial states include Canada, the United States, Australia, and South Africa.

Great Britain's colonial expansion was for the most part driven by commercial ambitions and competition with France. Investors saw converting the natives as a secondary concern. Historian of British history and culture, Laura Stevens, writes that British missions were "more talk than walk". From the beginning, the British talked (and wrote) a great deal about converting native populations, but actual efforts were few and feeble. Historian Jacob Schacter says these missions were universally Protestant, were based on belief in the traditional duty to "teach all nations", the sense of "obligation to extend the benefits of Christianity to heathen lands" (just as Europe itself had been "civilized" centuries before), and a "fervent pity" for those who had never heard the gospel. Schacter adds that "ambivalent benevolence" was at the heart of most British and American attitudes toward Native Americans. The British did not create widespread conversion.

==== In the United States ====
Missionaries played a crucial role in the acculturation of the Cherokee and other American Indians. A peace treaty with the Cherokee in 1794 stimulated a cultural revival and the welcoming of white missionaries, says historian Mark Noll. He has written that "what followed was a slow but steady acceptance of the Christian faith". Both Christianization and the Cherokee people received a fatal blow after the discovery of gold in north Georgia in 1828. Cherokee land was seized by the government, and the Cherokee people were transported West in what became known as the Trail of Tears.

The history of boarding schools for the indigenous populations in Canada and the US is not generally good. While the majority of native children did not attend boarding school at all, of those that did, recent studies indicate a few found happiness and refuge while many others found suffering, forced assimilation, and abuse.

Historian William Gerald McLoughlin has written that, humanitarians who saw the decline of indigenous people with regret, advocated education and assimilation as the native's only hope for survival. Over time, many missionaries came to respect the virtues of native culture. "After 1828, most missionaries found it difficult to defend the policies of their government" writes McLoughlin.

The beginning of American Protestant missions abroad followed the sailing of William Carey from England to India in 1793 after the Great awakening.

== Africa (19th to 21st centuries) ==
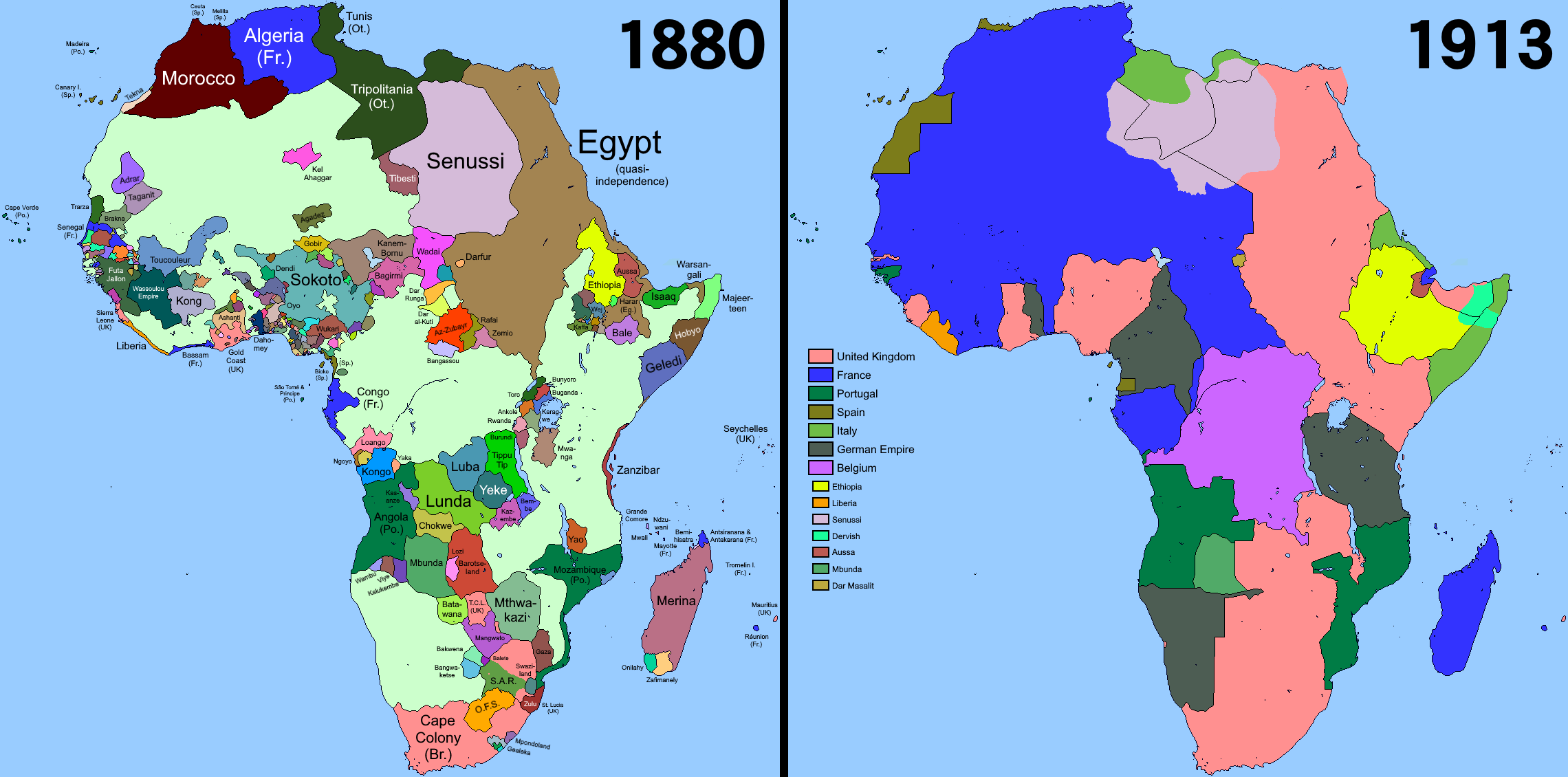
Scramble-for-Africa-1880-1913-v2

Beginning in the mid-nineteenth century, New Imperialism was a second wave of colonialism that took place primarily in the years between 1870 and World War I in 1914. It differed from earlier colonialism in many ways. For example, during this time, colonial powers gained territory at almost three times the rate of the earlier period particularly in what is sometimes referred to as the scramble for Africa.

Some imperial practices, (combined with pre-existing conditions in the colonial states), have had negative long-term effects on the colonial states, socially and politically, as well as on economic development, the development of democracy, and the ability of local governments to accomplish policy goals. The political legacies of colonialism include political instability, violence and ethnic exclusion, which is also linked to civil strife and civil war, while contact with the colonial slave trade has had additional harmful effects.

According to political scientists Alexander de Juan and Jan Henryk Pierskalla, the legacy of Protestant Christianization is largely one of beneficial long-term effects in the areas of human capital, political participation, and democratization. De Juan and Pierskalla add that "Sociologists have identified the key role of Christian missionaries, in particular Protestant missionaries, in generating a democratic legacy for many former colonies, through the spread of literacy, mass printing, and voluntary organizations..."

Theologian Justo Gonzales has written that, while the sixteenth century has generally been seen as the "great age of Catholic expansion", the nineteenth century was that for Protestantism. This included translating the Bible and other Christian writings into the local language (in more than half of the world's over 7000 languages). Missionaries of this era worked with indigenous people to create a written grammar, a listed inventory of native traditions, and a dictionary of their spoken language, (in approximately 90% of those languages). Tracing the impact of this shows local native cultures have responded with "movements of indigenization and cultural liberation".

Sanneh writes that "The translated scripture ... has become the benchmark of awakening and renewal" in Africa. According to anthropologist Elizabeth Isichei, it is the transition to literacy that translation of scripture and missionary schools created that engendered much of the transformation that followed. In Sanneh's view, this means that western missionaries pioneered the "largest, most diverse and most vigorous movement of cultural renewal in [the] history" of Africa.

In 1900 under colonial rule there were just under 9 million Christians in Africa. By 1960, and the end of colonialism there were about 60 million. By 2005, African Christians had increased to 393 million, about half of the continent's total population at that time. Population in Africa has continued to grow with the percentage of Christians remaining at about half in 2022. According to Isichei, "The expansion of Christianity in twentieth-century Africa has been so dramatic that it has been called 'the fourth great age of Christian expansion'."

=== Zaire ===
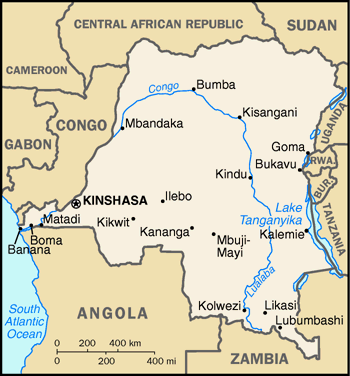
Map of the Democratic Republic of Congo (Zaire)

Simon Kimbangu's movement, the Kimbanguist church had a controversial reputation. In its early days in the Congo, it was suppressed for forty years, and is now the most studied of all the African prophet movements. It has become an establishment church in the DRC (Zaire), is very much involved in modern Congolese life, and with upwards of 3 million members, is now the largest independent church in Africa.

Whether Kimbanguism is a political or a religious movement is resolved by making a distinction between the genuine Kimbanguists and the pseudo-Kimbanguists, also known as the Ngunzists. Of first importance to genuine Kimbanguism is unquestioning acceptance of the intercession of Christ. Measured according to Reformation criteria, the Church of Jesus Christ of this Earth by the Prophet Simon Kimbangu (EJCSK) is a Christian religion. However, as James W. Fernandez says, it is a mistake to identify Christianity only with its European version.

Jules Rosette shows how ritual symbolization is the training ground, the interface, for the translation of the African into the Christian, "how ritual vocabulary translates tradition into new practices". Christianity, she suggests, provides the grammar and syntax, as it were, and traditional customs the lexicon that is formulated by Christianity into a new religious argument.

=== Tanzania ===
In Tanzania, a child is not a full member of society until they reach adulthood. Adulthood begins at puberty, but a man fully enters adult society by marrying, a woman by giving birth, and the transition from childhood to adulthood is marked by initiation rites. For the Maasai, this includes circumcision of both boys and girls.

Anne Marie Stoner-Eby writes, "The Christianization of initiation rites in the Anglican Diocese of Maasai in what is now southeastern Tanzania is arguably the most famous instance of 'adaptation' in African mission Christianity." It has long been assumed that Vincent Lucas, Bishop of Maasai (1926–1944), initiated the Christianizing of the initiation rites in an effort to adapt, and not destroy African cultural life, publishing what became a famous essay on 'The Christian Approach to Non-Christian Customs'.

Initiation was one of a chief's most important and prestigious responsibilities, but long before 'adaptation' became a missionary watchword, Maasai clergy had taken advantage of a crucial increase in their numbers to place jando la kikristo (Christian initiation) in place of unyago wa lupanda (Lupanda initiation in ancestor worship) by 1913.

=== Other countries ===
Eastern Maghrib was one of the first three places in the world where Christians were a majority.

In the early twenty-first century outside the United States, Kenya has the largest yearly meeting of Quakers. In Uganda, more Anglicans attend church than do so in England. Ahafo, Ghana is recognized as more vigorously Christian than any place in the United Kingdom. There is revival in East Africa, and vigorous women's movements called Rukwadzano in Zimbabwe and Manyano in South Africa. The Apostles of John Maranke, which began in Rhodesia, now have branches in seven countries. (Note: As in all preceding cultures, Christianity in Africa has been influenced by local African culture just as local African culture has absorbed aspects of Christianity. Whether a church is 'orthodox' or 'syncretistic' is not an academic question, yet it remains a concern for anthropologists attempting to record a history of religious changes in Africa. Isichei writes that the history of religion focuses on "what is central to religion: belief, ritual and the religious community" while still recognizing that religion is of central importance to contemporary world history.)

== Decolonization ==
Just as Christianization had a role in colonialism, it has also played a central role in decolonization, moving former colonies toward independence. Shifting beliefs about Christianity's role in empire began in France in the 1930s and 40s. Christians were rethinking the relationship between religion and politics. From the 1960s onward, this new understanding of theology, combined with Christian activism, was instrumental in motivating indigenous people, such as the Algerians, to work toward and fight for independence from foreign governments. This, in turn, influenced global trends. In some colonial societies, Christian missionaries played a transformative role in the development of decolonization and post-colonial Christianity, while in others, the nature of the Christian missionary presence shaped the pattern of decolonization as one of violence and opposition.

In the post-colonial world, it has become necessary for Christianization to break free of its colonial moorings, says Sanneh. Mark Boyle writes that:

Christianity's historical alignment with the Western project and [the overlapping] histories of colonialism and imperialism raises questions about its capacity to serve as a progressive force in global affairs today. Placing Christianity under postcolonial scrutiny, ... Christianity offers a variety of complex, contradictory, and competing approaches to peace-building that variously defend the hegemonic ambitions of the West on the one hand and support critical practices that usurp and decenter the sovereign supremacy assumed by the West on the other.

== Global Christianization ==
Dana L. Robert has written that one third of the world's population is now Christian in a huge variety of forms. The geographic range, cultural diversity and organizational variety of these many types of Christians includes traditional Catholics in Brazil, Apostles in Zimbabwe, Coptic Christians still surviving in Egypt, new Pentecostals in Ghana, established Lutherans in Germany, and secret House church believers in China.

In the early twenty-first century, Christianity has been declining in the West and growing in former colonial lands. Sanneh says Christianity has become the most diverse, pluralist, fastest growing religion in the world.

=== China ===
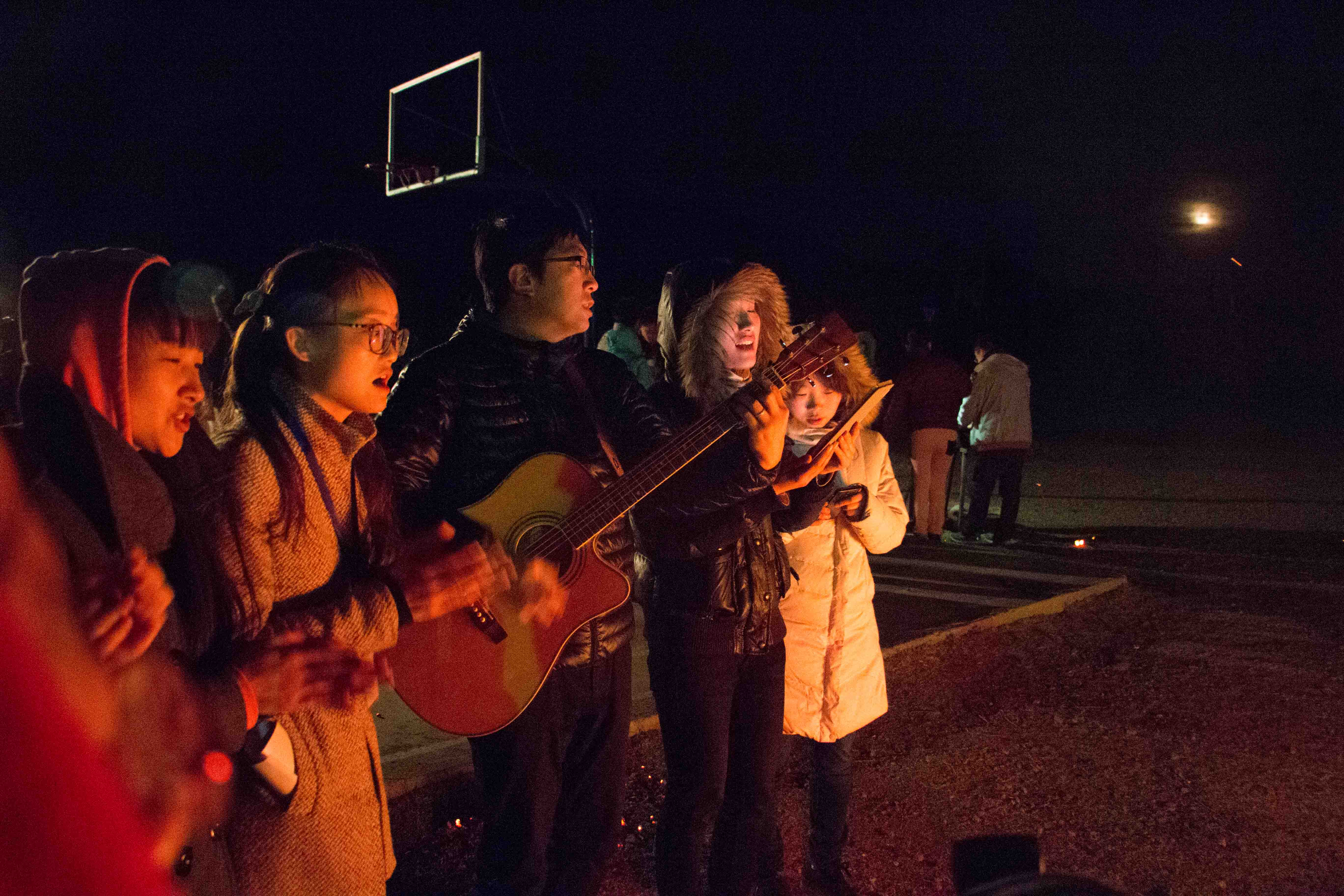
Chinese Christians singing at a camp fire

Joseph Tse-Hei Lee observes that, historically, Christianity has long had a tendency to flourish in areas where there is suffering, dislocation and warfare, and that this is evident in its modern development in China. Chaoshan in northeastern Guangdong Province has transitioned from a state of disintegration in the late Imperial era (960–1895) to one of modern entrepreneurial cosmopolitanism with the aid of Christianization. Indigenization happened quickly and Christianization has survived through family lineage networks, which function like a single corporate unit, and native congregations.

Christianity grew as a grassroots movement in rural areas first, through self-propagation and native agency. This led to an overlap of religious, kinship and territorial identities, so that when the socio-political order shattered, the church was able to step in. Lee sees this as revealing "the importance of the church as a major building block and a viable civic institution in the midst of widespread chaos and unrest".

Lee writes that hostility toward Christianity as expressed in the Anti-Christian Movement (1925–1926) and in the anti-religious Maoist Era (1949–1976), "the impact of regime change, encounters with secular state-building, the church's involvement in transforming local religious and socio-economic landscapes, and the importance of religious agency", are all key factors in Chinese Christianity. There exists a multiplicity of Chinese Christian experiences and religiosity, and they all tend to reject the view that Christianity is incompatible with modern Chinese culture.

== See also ==
- Anti-paganism policies of the early Byzantine Empire
- Christianity and other religions
- Christianity and violence
- Forcible conversion to Christianity
- History of Christianity
- History of Christian thought on persecution and tolerance
- Role of Christianity in civilization
- Spread of Christianity
- Conquistador
- Crusades
- European colonization of the Americas
- Goa Inquisition
- Inculturation
- Missions
- Taiping Rebellion
- Westernization
- Christianization of Anglo-Saxon England
- Christianization of England
- Christianization of Ireland
- Christianization of the Celtic peoples
- Christianization of Roman (Southern) France
- Christianization of Bavaria
- Christianization of the Netherlands
- Christianization of the Swiss
- Christianization of Lithuania
- Christianization of the Faroe Islands
- Christianization of the Basque people
- Christianization of Iceland
- Christianization of Scandinavia
- Christianization of Finland
- Christianization of Kievan Rus'
- Christianization of Poland
- Christianization of Bulgaria
- Christianization of Armenia
- Christianization of Goa
- Christianization of Tonga
- Christianization of Albania

In other religions

- History of religion
- Religious violence
- Islamization
- Judaism

== Bibliography ==
- Abrams, Lesley (2016). "The conversion of the Danelaw". Vikings and the Danelaw: Select Papers from the Proceedings of the Thirteenth Viking Congress, Nottingham and York, 21-30 August 1997 (reprint ed.). Havertown Oxford: Oxbow Books. pp. 31–44. ISBN 978-1-78570-453-6. JSTOR j.ctt1kw29nj.
- Abrams, Lesley (2000). "Conversion and Assimilation". Cultures in contact: Scandinavian settlement in England in the ninth and tenth centuries. Turnhout, Belgium: Brepols. ISBN 2-503-50978-9.
- Abruzzi, William (2018). Mithraism and Christianity. doi:10.13140/RG.2.2.36486.52804.
- Abulafia, David (2017) [2002]. "Introduction". In Abulafia, David; Berend, Nóra Berend (eds.). Medieval Frontiers: Concepts and Practices. Routledge Taylor and Francis Group. ISBN 978-1-351-91858-9. **book has: 0-7546-0522-1
- Adomen of Iona (1995). Sharpe, Richard (ed.). Life of St Columba. Penguin UK. ISBN 978-0-14190-741-3.
- Aleksidze, Nikoloz (2018). "7: Caucasia: Albania, Armenia and Georgia". In Lössl, Josef; Baker-Brian, Nicholas J. (eds.). A Companion to Religion in Late Antiquity. John Wiley and Sons. ISBN 978-1-118-96810-9.
- Alfsvåg, K. (2022). "The Role of Confirmation in Christian Initiation". Journal of Youth and Theology. 1 (2): 251–270. doi:10.1163/24055093-bja10036. hdl:11250/3051856. S2CID 252339347.
- Allott, Stephen (1974). Alcuin of York, c.732 to 804 CE: his life and letters. William Sessions Limited. ISBN 978-0-900-65721-4.
- Anastos, Milton (1967). "The Edict of Milan (313): A Defence of Its Traditional Authorship and Designation". Revue des études byzantines. 25 (1): 13–41. doi:10.3406/rebyz.1967.1383.
- Antoljak, Stjepan (1994). Pregled hrvatske povijesti (2 ed.). Orbis. ISBN 978-953-6044-01-6.
- Armstrong, John H. (2007). Understanding Four Views on the Lord's Supper. Zondervan. pp. 13–15. ISBN 978-0-310-26268-8.
- Bagnall, Roger S. (2021). Egypt in Late Antiquity (illustrated, reprint ed.). Princeton University Press. ISBN 978-1-4008-2116-7.
- Baldovin, J. F. (2000). "The Celebration of the Eucharist: the Origin of the Rite and the Development of its Interpretation (Book Review)". Theological Studies. 61 (3): 583. doi:10.1177/004056390006100330. S2CID 220492390.
- Barbero, Alessandro (2004). Charlemagne: Father of a Continent. University of California Press. ISBN 978-0-520-23943-2.
- Barker, Adam; Lowman, Emma Battell (n.d.). "Settler colonialism". Global Social Theory.
- Barnes, T.D. (1985). "Review of Christianizing the Roman Empire A.D. 100–400 by R. Macmullen". Echos du Monde Classique: Classical Views. 29 (3): 495–496.
- Barton, Simon (2009). A History of Spain (2nd, revised ed.). Bloomsbury Publishing. ISBN 978-1-137-01347-7.
- Bayliss, Richard (2004). Provincial Cilicia and the Archaeology of Temple Conversion. Oxford: Archaeopress. ISBN 978-1-84171-634-3.
- Bede (2008) [1843]. The Complete Works of Venerable Bede: Ecclesiastical history. Vol. 3. Translated by Giles, John Allen. Harvard University.
- Belmessous, Saliha (2013). Assimilation and Empire: Uniformity in French and British Colonies, 1541–1954. OUP. ISBN 978-0-19-957916-7.
- Berend, Nora; Urbańczyk, Przemysław; Wiszewski, Przemysław (2013). Central Europe in the High Middle Ages: Bohemia, Hungary and Poland, c. 900-c. 1300. New York: Cambridge University Press. ISBN 978-0-521-78156-5.
- Boatwright, Mary Taliaferro; Gargola, Daniel J.; Talbert, Richard John Alexander (2004). The Romans: From Village to Empire. Oxford: Oxford University Press. ISBN 978-0-19-511875-9.
- Bouchier, Edmund Spenser (1914). Spain Under the Roman Empire. B. H. Blackwell.
- Bokenkotter, Thomas (2007). A Concise History of the Catholic Church (Revised ed.). New York: Crown Publishing Group. ISBN 978-0-307-42348-1.
- Boyle, Mark (2010). "Beyond the 'Sigh of the Oppressed Creature': A Critical Geographical Enquiry into Christianity's Contributions to the Making of a Peaceable West". Annals of the Association of American Geographers. 100 (3): 678–94. doi:10.1080/00045601003795095. JSTOR 40863555. S2CID 55367128.
- Bradbury, Scott (1995). "Julian's Pagan Revival and the Decline of Blood Sacrifice". Phoenix. 49 (4): 331–56. doi:10.2307/1088885. JSTOR 1088885.
- Bradbury, Scott (1994). "Constantine and the Problem of Anti-Pagan Legislation in the Fourth Century". Classical Philology. 89 (2): 120–139. doi:10.1086/367402. S2CID 159997492.
- Brink, Stefan (2004). "New Perspectives on the Christianization of Scandinavia and the Organization of the Early Church". Scandinavia and Europe 800-1350: Contact, Conflict, and Coexistence. ISD. pp. 163–175. ISBN 978-2-503-51085-9.
- Brita, Antonella (2020). "Genres of Ethiopian-Eritrean Christian Literature with a Focus on Hagiography". In Kelly, Samantha (ed.). A Companion to Medieval Ethiopia and Eritrea. Brill. pp. 252–281. ISBN 978-90-04-41943-8.
- "British Empire". British Empire | History, Countries, Map, Size, & Facts | Britannica. Encyclopedia Britannica. January 5, 2023.
- Bromley, Myron (1993). "Contextualization of Christianity and Christianization of Language: A Case Study from the Highlands of Papua New Guinea". International Bulletin of Missionary Research. 17 (2). doi:10.1177/239693939301700219. S2CID 220489324.
- Brown, Peter (1998). "Christianization and religious conflict". In Averil Cameron; Peter Garnsey (eds.). The Cambridge Ancient History XIII: The Late Empire, A.D. 337–425. The Cambridge Ancient History, second series. Cambridge University Press. pp. 632–664. ISBN 978-0-521-30200-5.
- Brown, P. (1963). "St. Augustine's Attitude to Religious Coercion". Journal of Roman Studies. 54 (1–2): 107–116. doi:10.2307/298656. JSTOR 298656. S2CID 162757247.
- Brown, Peter (2003). The rise of Western Christendom: triumph and diversity, A.D. 200-1000 (2nd ed.). Malden, Mass.: Blackwell Publishers. ISBN 978-0-631-22137-1.
- Brown, Peter (2012). Through the Eye of a Needle: Wealth, the Fall of Rome, and the Making of Christianity in the West, 350–550 AD. Princeton University Press. ISBN 978-0-691-15290-5.
- Bukowska, Aneta (2012). "The Origins of Christianity in Poland. Actual Research on the Church Archaeology". Christianisierung Europas: Entstehung, Entwicklung und Konsolidierung im archäologischen Befund. Schnell & Steiner. pp. 449–468.
- Bürki, Bruno (1977). "Traditional Initiation in Africa". Studia Liturgica. 12 (4): 201–206. doi:10.1177/003932077701200404. S2CID 188624108.
- Burrows, Mathew (1986). "'Mission civilisatrice': French cultural policy in the Middle East, 1860–1914". The Historical Journal. 29 (1): 109–135. doi:10.1017/S0018246X00018641. S2CID 154801621.
- Butler, Cuthbert (1919). Benedictine Monachism: Studies in Benedictine Life and Rule. New York: Longmans, Green and Company.
- Butler, Jon (1990). Awash in a Sea of Faith: Christianizing the American People (illustrated, revised, reprint ed.). Harvard University Press. ISBN 978-0-674-05601-5.
- Cameron, Alan (2011). The Last Pagans of Rome. Oxford University Press. ISBN 978-0-19-974727-6.
- Casanova, José (1994). Public Religions in the Modern World. Chicago: The University of Chicago Press. ISBN 978-0-226-09535-6.
- Castañeda, Antonia I. (1993). "Two: Sexual violence in the politics and policies of Conquest". In de la Torre, Adela; Pesquera, Beatriz M. (eds.). Building with Our Hands: New Directions in Chicana Studies. University of California Press. ISBN 978-0-520-07090-5.
- Cheng, Christina Miu Bing (1999). Macau A Cultural Janus. Hong Kong University Press. ISBN 978-962-209-486-4.
- Christiansen, Eric (1997). The Northern Crusades. London: Penguin books. ISBN 978-0-14-026653-5.
- Clark, Elizabeth A. (1992). "The End of Ancient Christianity". Ancient Philosophy. 12 (2): 543–546. doi:10.5840/ancientphil199212240.
- Clark, Gillian (2011). "Augustine and the merciful Barbarians". In Mathisen, Ralph W.; Shanzer, Danuta (eds.). Romans, Barbarians, and the Transformation of the Roman World: Cultural Interaction and the Creation of Identity in Late Antiquity (illustrated ed.). Ashgate Publishing, Ltd. pp. 1–4. ISBN 978-0-7546-6814-5.
- Cohan, Sara (2005). "A brief history of the Armenian Genocide" (PDF). Social Education. 69 (6): 333–337.
- Collar, Anna (2013). Religious Networks in the Roman Empire (illustrated, reprint ed.). Cambridge University Press. ISBN 978-1-107-04344-2.
- Crampton, R. J (2005). A concise history of Bulgaria (second ed.). Cambridge University Press. ISBN 978-0-521-85085-8.
- Cusack, Carole M. (1998). Conversion Among the Germanic Peoples (reprint ed.). A&C Black. ISBN 978-0-304-70155-1.
- Danuta, Shanzer (March 1998). "Dating the Baptism of Clovis: The bishop of Vienna vs the bishop of Tours". Early Medieval Europe. 7 (1): 29–57. doi:10.1111/1468-0254.00017. S2CID 161819012.
- Dean, Sidney E. (2015). "Felling the Irminsul: Charlemagne's Saxon Wars". Medieval Warfare. 5 (2): 15–20. JSTOR 48578430.
- de Bérier, Franciszek Longchamps; Domingo, Rafael (2022). "Introduction". In de Bérier, Franciszek Longchamps; Domingo, Rafael (eds.). Law and Christianity in Poland. Routledge. pp. 1–6. ISBN 978-1-032-01972-7.
- de Juan, Alexander; Pierskalla, Jan Henryk (2017). "The Comparative Politics of Colonialism and Its Legacies: An Introduction". Politics & Society. 45 (2 Special Issue): 159–172. doi:10.1177/0032329217704434. S2CID 54971921.
- Demiraj, Bardhyl (2002). "Einheitlichkeit und Spaltung im Laufe des Christianisierungsprozesses der Albaner. Eine ethno-linguistische Fallstudie" (PDF). Studime (in German). Academy of Albanological Studies: 23–41.
- Demiraj, Bardhyl (2011). "Rrënjë dhe degë të krishterimit ndër shqiptarë" (PDF). Hylli i Dritës (in Albanian). 2. Shkodër: 58–78.
- Digeser, Elizabeth DePalma (2000). The Making of a Christian Empire: Lactantius & Rome. Cornell University Press. ISBN 978-0-8014-3594-2.
- Dollinger, Philippe (1999). The German Hansa. Routledge. ISBN 978-0-415-19073-2.
- Dragnea, Mihai (2020). The Wendish Crusade, 1147: The Development of Crusading Ideology in the Twelfth Century. NY: Routledge. ISBN 978-0-367-36696-4.
- Drake, H. A. (1995). "Constantine and Consensus". Church History. 64 (1): 1–15. doi:10.2307/3168653. JSTOR 3168653. S2CID 163129848.
- Drake, H.A., ed. (2006). Violence in Late Antiquity: Perceptions and Practices. Aldershot: Ashgate. ISBN 978-0-7546-5498-8.
- Eder, Jeanne; Reyhner, Jon (2017). American Indian Education: A History (2nd ed.). University of Oklahoma Press. ISBN 978-0-8061-5991-1.
- Elsie, Robert (2003). Early Albania: A reader of Historical texts, 11th–17th centuries. Wiesbaden: Otto Harrassowitz Verlag. ISBN 978-3-447-04783-8.
- Elsie, Robert (2001a). A Dictionary of Albanian Religion, Mythology and Folk Culture. London: Hurst & Company. ISBN 1-85065-570-7.
- Fairchild, Mary (2021). "Take an Illustrated Tour of Christian Symbols". Learn Religions. Interdenominational Christian Training Center.
- Farmer, David Hugh, ed. (1995). Benedict's Disciples. Gracewing. ISBN 978-0-85244-274-6.
- Fernandez, James W. (1979). "Africanization, Europeanization, Christianization". History of Religions. 18 (3): 284–292. doi:10.1086/462823. S2CID 162935593.
- Firlej, Dominik (2021–2022). "Why did Polish Kings not go on Crusade in the Levant?" (PDF). The Cupola. 16: 120–135.
- Fischer, Bernd J.; Schmitt, Oliver Jens (2022). A Concise History of Albania. Cambridge University Press. ISBN 978-1-009-25490-8.
- Fletcher, Richard (1999). The Barbarian Conversion: From Paganism to Christianity. Berkeley: University of California Press. ISBN 978-0-520-21859-8.
- Fonnesberg-Schmidt, Iben (2007). The popes and the Baltic crusades, 1147–1254. Brill. ISBN 978-90-04-15502-2.
- Fonnesberg-Schmidt, Iben (2009). "Pope Honorius III and Mission and Crusades in the Baltic Region". In Murray, Alan V. (ed.). The Clash of Cultures on the Medieval Baltic Frontier. Ashgate Publishing, Ltd. pp. 103–122. ISBN 978-0-7546-6483-3.
- Fontaine, Darcie (2016). Decolonizing Christianity: Religion and the End of Empire in France and Algeria. Cambridge University Press. ISBN 978-1-107-11817-1.
- Forbes, Bruce David (2008). Christmas: A Candid History (illustrated, reprint ed.). Berkeley: University of California Press. ISBN 978-0-520-25802-0.
- Forstreuter, Kurt (1938). "Deutschland und Litauen im Mittelalter". (No Title). Studien zum Detuschtum im Osten. 1. Königsberg: Ost-europa.
- Fousek, Jan; Kaše, Vojtěch; Mertel, Adam; Výtvarová, Eva; Chalupa, Aleš (December 26, 2018). "Spatial constraints on the diffusion of religious innovations: The case of early Christianity in the Roman Empire". PLOS One. 13 (12) e0208744. Bibcode:2018PLoSO..1308744F. doi:10.1371/journal.pone.0208744. PMC 6306252. PMID 30586375.
- Friese, Thomas (March 22, 2017). "In Deep: A Brief History of Bohemia". Butterfield & Robinson.
- García-Arenal, Mercedes; Glazer-Eytan, Yonatan (2019). Forced conversion in Christianity, Judaism and Islam: coercion and faith in premodern Iberia and beyond. Brill. ISBN 978-90-04-41682-6.
- Ghosh, Shami (2016). "Paul the Deacon and the Ancient History of the Lombards". Writing the Barbarian Past: Studies in Early Medieval Historical Narrative. Brill. pp. 115–152. ISBN 978-90-04-30522-9.
- Gillman, Florence Morgan (2003). Herodias: At Home in that Fox's Den. Liturgical Press. pp. 25–30. ISBN 978-0-8146-5108-7.
- Goldberg, Eric J. (2006). Struggle for Empire: Kingship and Conflict under Louis the German, 817–876. Cornell University Press. ISBN 978-0-8014-7529-0.
- Gonzalez, Justo L. (2010). The Story of Christianity. Vol. 2: The Reformation to the Present Day. HarperCollins. ISBN 978-0-06-185589-4.
- Goodenough, Erwin R. (1962). "Catacomb Art". Journal of Biblical Literature. 81 (2): 113–142. doi:10.2307/3264749. JSTOR 3264749.
- Gregory, Timothy E. (1986). "The Survival of Paganism in Christian Greece: A Critical Essay". The American Journal of Philology. 107 (2): 229–242. doi:10.2307/294605. ISSN 0002-9475. JSTOR 294605.
- Haas, Christopher (2002). Alexandria in Late Antiquity Topography and Social Conflict. Johns Hopkins University Press. ISBN 978-0-8018-7033-0.
- Hakobyan, Aleksan H. (2021). "About the Dating of the Christianization of Caucasian Albania". Vostok. Afro-Aziatskie Obshchestva: Istoriia I Sovremennost. 5 (5): 71–81. doi:10.31857/S086919080014885-0. S2CID 240239868.
- Haley, Gene C. (2002). "Tamlachta: The Map of Plague Burials and Some Implications for Early Irish History". Proceedings of the Harvard Celtic Colloquium. 22: 96–140. JSTOR 40285165.
- Hanigan, James P. (April 1983). "Conversion and Christian Ethics". Theology Today. 40 (1): 25–35. doi:10.1177/004057368304000104. S2CID 147202154. Archived from the original on May 2, 2012.
- Hanson, R. P. C. (1978). "The transformation of pagan temples into churches in the early Christian centuries". Journal of Semitic Studies. 23 (2): 257–267. doi:10.1093/jss/23.2.257.
- Hardt, Matthias (2001). "11, Hesse, Elbe, Saale and the frontiers of the Carolingian empire". The Transformation of Frontiers From Late Antiquity to the Carolingians. Brill. pp. 219–232. ISBN 978-90-04-11115-8.
- Harmer, Florence E. (1946). "The english contribution to the epistolary usages of early scandinavian kings". Saga-Book. 13: 115–155. ISSN 0305-9219. JSTOR 48611990.
- Harnett, Benjamin (2017). "The Diffusion of the Codex". Classical Antiquity. 36 (2). University of California Press: 183–235. doi:10.1525/ca.2017.36.2.183. JSTOR 26362608.
- Harney, Lorcan (2017). "Christianising Pagan Worlds in Conversion-Era Ireland: Archaeological Evidence for the Origins of Irish Ecclesiastical Sites". Proceedings of the Royal Irish Academy: Archaeology, Culture, History, Literature. 117C: 103–30. doi:10.3318/priac.2017.117.07. S2CID 165970409.
- Hart, David Bentley (2009). Atheist Delusions: The Christian Revolution and Its Fashionable Enemies (unabridged ed.). Yale University Press. ISBN 978-0-300-15564-8.
- Headrick, Daniel R. (2012). Power Over Peoples Technology, Environments, and Western Imperialism, 1400 to the Present. Princeton University Press. ISBN 978-1-4008-3359-7.
- Hebblewhite, Mark (2020). Theodosius and the Limits of Empire. London: Routledge. doi:10.4324/9781315103334. ISBN 978-1-138-10298-9. S2CID 213344890.
- Hellerman, Joseph H. (2009). When the Church Was a Family: Recapturing Jesus' Vision for Authentic Christian Community. Nashville: B&H Publishing Group. ISBN 978-1-4336-6843-2.
- Herrin, Judith (2009). "Book Burning as purification". In Rousseau, Philip; Papoutsakis, Emmanuel (eds.). Transformations of Late Antiquity: Essays for Peter Brown, Volume 2 (illustrated, reprint ed.). Ashgate Publishing, Ltd. ISBN 978-0-7546-6553-3.
- Higham, Nicholas John; Ryan, Martin J. (2013). The Anglo-Saxon world. New Haven: Yale University Press. ISBN 978-0-300-12534-4.
- Higham, Nicholas John (1997). The Convert Kings: Power and Religious Affiliation in Early Anglo-Saxon England. Manchester, UK: Manchester University Press. ISBN 978-0-7190-4827-2.
- Hopkins, Keith (1998). "Christian Number and Its Implications". Journal of Early Christian Studies. 6 (2): 185–226. doi:10.1353/earl.1998.0035. S2CID 170769034.
- Horn, Cornelia B. (1998). "St. Nino and the Christianization of pagan Georgia". Medieval Encounters. 4 (3): 242–264. doi:10.1163/157006798X00151.
- Hunyadi, Zsolt; Laszlovszky, József (2001). The Crusades and the Military Orders: Expanding the Frontiers of Medieval Latin Christianity. Budapest: Central European University Press. ISBN 978-963-9241-42-8.
- Hyatt, Irwin T. (1970). "Protestant Missions in China, 1877-1890: The Institutionalization of Good Works". In Liu, Kwang-Ching (ed.). American Missionaries in China. Harvard University Asia Center. pp. 93–126. ISBN 978-1-68417-152-1.
- Hykolli, Atdhe; Krasniqi, Seniha (2020). "The Phenomenon of Calendar Lyrical Poetry and Its Genesis". Journal of Awareness. 5 (2): 77–84. doi:10.26809/joa.5.007 (inactive July 11, 2025). eISSN 2149-6544.
- Irmscher, Johannes (1988). "Non-christians and sectarians under Justinian: the fate of the inculpated". Collection de l'Institut des Sciences et Techniques de l'Antiquité. 367 (1): 165–167.
- Isichei, Elizabeth (1995). A history of Christianity in Africa: From antiquity to the present. Wm. B. Eerdmans Publishing. ISBN 978-0-8028-0843-1.
- Ivanič, Peter (2016). "The origins of Christianity in the territory of Czech and Slovak republics within the contexts of written sources". European Journal of Science and Theology. 12 (6): 123–130.
- Jensen, Robin M. (2012). "Material and Documentary Evidence for the Practice of Early Christian Baptism". Journal of Early Christian Studies. 20 (3): 371–405. doi:10.1353/earl.2012.0019. S2CID 170787102.
- Jestice, Phyllis G. (1997). Wayward Monks and the Religious Revolution of the Eleventh Century. BRILL. ISBN 978-90-04-10722-9.
- Johansen, Bruce Elliott (2005). The Native Peoples of North America A History · Volume 1. Praeger Publishers. ISBN 978-0-275-98720-6. "In the Americas, the Catholic priest Bartolome de las Casas avidly encouraged enquiries into the Spanish conquest's many cruelties. Las Casas chronicled Spanish brutality against the Native peoples in excruciating detail."
- Jolly, Karen Louise (1996). Popular religion in late Saxon England: elf charms in context. Chapel Hill: University of North Carolina Press. ISBN 0-8078-2262-0.
- Jones, Arnold Hugh Martin (1986). The Later Roman Empire, 284-602: A Social Economic and Administrative Survey. Vol. 1 (reprint ed.). JHU Press. ISBN 978-0-8018-3353-3.
- Kaldellis, Anthony (2012). Procopius of Caesarea: Tyranny, History, and Philosophy at the End of Antiquity. University of Pennsylvania Press. ISBN 978-0-8122-0241-0.
- Kalu, Ogbu U. (2000). Decolonization and African Churches: The Nigerian Experience, 1955–1975 (PDF). bidrag til sesjonen om «Missions, modernization, colonization and decolonization» ved International Congress of Historical Sciences, Oslo. Oslo: International Congress of Historical Sciences.
- Kirby, David Peter (2000). The earliest English kings (Rev. ed.). London; New York: Routledge. ISBN 978-0-415-24211-0.
- Kirby, David Peter (July 13, 2006). A Concise History of Finland. Cambridge University Press. ISBN 978-0-521-83225-0.
- Kloft, Hans (2010). Mysterienkulte der Antike. Götter, Menschen, Rituale [Mystery Cults of Antiquity. Gods, Humans, Rituals] (in German). Munich: C.H. Beck. ISBN 978-3-406-44606-1.
- Koenig, Harold G.; King, Dana E.; Carson, Verna Benner, eds. (2012). Handbook of Religion and Health (second ed.). New Yorkc: Oxford University Press. ISBN 978-0-19-533595-8.
- Lavan, Luke (2011). Lavan, Luke; Mulryan, Michael (eds.). The Archaeology of Late Antique "paganism". Brill. p. xxiv. ISBN 978-90-04-19237-9.
- Lavan, Luke; Mulryan, Michael, eds. (2011). The Archaeology of Late Antique 'Paganism'. Leiden: Brill. ISBN 978-90-04-19237-9.
- Lee, Joseph Tse-Hei (2018). Lee, Joseph Tse-Hei (ed.). Christianizing South China: Mission, Development, and Identity in Modern Chaoshan. Springer. ISBN 978-3-319-72266-5.
- Leithart, Peter J. (2010). Defending Constantine The Twilight of an Empire and the Dawn of Christendom. InterVarsity Press. ISBN 978-0-8308-2722-0.
- Lenski, Noel (1995). "The Gothic Civil War and the Date of the Gothic Conversion". Greek, Roman and Byzantine Studies. 36 (1).
- Leone, Anna (2013). The End of the Pagan City: Religion, Economy, and Urbanism in Late Antique North Africa (illustrated ed.). OUP. ISBN 978-0-19-957092-8.
- Lichtenberger, Achim; Raja, Rubina (2018). "From synagogue to church: The Appropriation of the Synagogue of Gerasa/Jerash under Justinian". Jahrbuch für Antike und Christentum. 61.
- Lilienfeld, Aidan (2022). "Baltic Frontiers". Columbia Journal of History. Columbia University.
- Lim, Richard (2012). "33 Christianization, Secularization, and the Transformation of Public Life". In Rousseau, Philip (ed.). A Companion to Late Antiquity. John Wiley & Sons. ISBN 978-1-118-29347-8.
- Loosley, Emma (2012). The Architecture and Liturgy of the Bema in Fourth- To-Sixth-Century Syrian Churches (illustrated ed.). Brill. ISBN 978-90-04-23182-5.
- Lund, James (2022). "Religion and Thought". In Johnson, Wendell G.; Barbe, Katharina (eds.). Modern Germany. ABC-CLIO. ISBN 978-1-4408-6454-4.
- MacCormack, Sabine (1997). "Sin, citizenship, and the salvation of souls: The impact of Christian priorities on late-Roman and post-Roman society". Comparative Studies in Society and History. 39 (4): 644–673. doi:10.1017/S0010417500020843. S2CID 144021596.
- MacMullen, Ramsay (1984). Christianizing the Roman Empire: (A.D. 100–400). New Haven: Yale University Press. ISBN 978-0-300-03216-1.
- Malcolm, Noel (1998). Kosovo: A Short History. ISBN 978-0-3304-1224-7.
- Mazeika, Rasa (2017). "9, Granting Power to Enemy Gods in the Chronicles of the Baltic Crusades". In Abulafia, David; Berend, Nora (eds.). Medieval Frontiers: Concepts and Practices. Routledge. pp. 153–172. ISBN 978-1-31524-928-5.
- Mansi, Giovanni Domenico (1762). Concilia. Vol. VIII.
- Marcos, M. (2013). "The Debate on Religious Coercion in Ancient Christianity" (PDF). Chaos e Kosmos. 13: 1–16.
- Marin-Guzmán, Roberto (1992). "Crusade in Al-Andalus: the eleventh century formation of the Reconquista as an ideology". Islamic Studies. 31 (3): 287–318. JSTOR 20840082.
- Markus, Robert Austin (1990). The End of Ancient Christianity (illustrated, reprint ed.). Cambridge University Press. ISBN 978-0-521-33949-0.
- Mathew, Arnold Harris (2018). The Life and Times of Rodrigo Borgia, Pope Alexander VI. Creative Media Partners, LLC. ISBN 978-0-342-68601-8.
- Matthews, Roy T.; Platt, F. DeWitt (1992). The Western Humanities. Mayfield Pub. Co. ISBN 978-0-87484-785-7.
- Mayr-Harting, Henry (1991). The Coming of Christianity to Anglo-Saxon England (3rd ed.). University Park, PA: Pennsylvania State University Press. ISBN 978-0-271-00769-4.
- McKinion, Steve (2001). Life and Practice in the Early Church: A Documentary Reader. NYU Press. ISBN 978-0-8147-6126-7.
- McKinnell, John (2021). "Pre-Christian Traces in British Ballads and Other Popular Poetry". Folklore and Old Norse mythology. Helsinki: The Kalevala Society. ISBN 978-952-9534-02-9.
- McLoughlin, William Gerald (1984). Cherokees and Missionaries, 1789–1839. Yale University Press. ISBN 978-0-300-03075-4.
- Meaney, Audrey L. (January 2004). "'And we forbeodað eornostlice ælcne hæðenscipe': Wulfstan and Late Anglo-Saxon and Norse 'Heathenism'". Wulfstan, Archbishop of York. Studies in the Early Middle Ages. 10. Brepols Publishers: 461–500. doi:10.1484/m.sem-eb.3.3720. ISBN 978-2-503-52224-1.
- Monroe, Paul (1909). A Text-book in the History of Education. London: The Macmillan Company.
- Moravcsik, Gyula (December 1947). "The Role of the Byzantine Church in Medieval Hungary". American Slavic and East European Review. 6 (3/4): 134–151. doi:10.2307/2491705. JSTOR 2491705.
- Morgan, Kenneth (2007). Slavery and the British Empire: From Africa to America (illustrated, reprint ed.). OUP. ISBN 978-0-19-923899-6.
- Murphy, G. Ronald (September 2014). "Book Review: The Conversion of Scandinavia: Vikings, Merchants, and Missionaries in the Remaking of Northern Europe". Christianity & Literature. 63 (4): 542–545. doi:10.1177/014833311406300419. ISSN 0148-3331.
- Neely, Alan (2020). Christian Mission. Wipf and Stock Publishers. ISBN 978-1-7252-8819-5.
- Noll, Mark A. (1992). A History of Christianity in the United States and Canada. Eerdmans. ISBN 978-0-8028-0651-2.
- Norris, Harry Thirlwall (1993). Islam in the Balkans: Religion and Society Between Europe and the Arab World. Columbia, S.C: University of South Carolina Press. p. 211. ISBN 978-0-87249-977-5. OCLC 28067651.
- Nowell, Charles E.; Magdoff, Harry; Webster, Richard A. (November 13, 2022). "Western colonialism". Western colonialism | Definition, History, Examples, & Effects | Britannica. Encyclopedia Britannica.
- Novak, Ralph Martin (2001). Christianity and the Roman Empire: Background Texts. Bloomsbury Academic. pp. 302–303. ISBN 978-1-56338-347-2.
- Oostindie, Geert, ed. (2008). Dutch Colonialism, Migration and Cultural Heritage Past and Present. Brill. ISBN 978-90-04-25388-9.
- Ojewunmi, Emmanuel Adelekan; Amodu, Akeem (2021). "Sustainable Development Goals and the Baptist Convention in Nigeria: A Critical Overview". International Journal of Research and Innovation in Social Science. 5 (8): 118–123.
- Padberg, Lutz von (1998). Die Christianisierung Europas im Mittelalter (in German). Stuttgart: Reclam. ISBN 978-3-15-017015-1. OCLC 493859593.
- Paiva, José Pedro (2017). "The Inquisition Tribunal in Goa: Why and for What Purpose?". Journal of Early Modern History. 21 (6): 565–593. doi:10.1163/15700658-12342575. hdl:10316/45000.
- Paul, Marcus (2016). The Evil That Men Do: Faith, Injustice and the Church. Sacristy Press. ISBN 978-1-908381-97-2.
- Plummer, Robert L. (2005). "The Great Commission in the New Testament". In Rainer, Thom S.; Lawless, Charles (eds.). The Challenge of the Great Commission: Essays on God's Mandate for the Local Church. Pinnacle Publishers. pp. 33–47. ISBN 978-0-97423-061-0.
- Pluskowski, Aleks (2011). "The Archaeology of Paganism". In Helena Hamerow; David A. Hinton; Sally Crawford (eds.). The Oxford Handbook of Anglo-Saxon Archaeology. Oxford: Oxford University Press. pp. 764–778. ISBN 978-0-19-921214-9.
- Pop, Ioan-Aurel (2009). "Romania and Romanians in Europe: A Historical Perspective". In Boari, Vasile; Gherghina, Sergiu (eds.). Weighting Differences: Romanian Identity in the Wider European Context. Cambridge Scholars Publishing. ISBN 978-1-4438-1215-3.
- Popovski, Ivan (2017). "Medieval Croatian states". A Short History of South East Europe. Lulu Press, Inc. ISBN 978-1-365-95394-1.
- Poppe, Andrzej (1991). "Christianity and Ideological change in Kievan Rus': The First Hundred Years". Canadian-American Slavic Studies. 25 (1–4): 3–26. doi:10.1163/221023991X00038.
- Praet, Danny (1992–1993). "Explaining the Christianization of the Roman Empire. Older theories and recent developments". Sacris Erudiri. 23: 5–119. doi:10.1484/J.SE.2.303776.
- Priestley, Herbert Ingram (2018). France Overseas: A Study of Modern Imperialism. Routledge. p. 192. ISBN 978-1-351-00241-7.
- Qafleshi, Muharrem (2011). Opoja dhe Gora ndër shekuj [Opoja and Gora During Centuries]. Albanological Institute of Pristina. ISBN 978-9951-596-51-0.
- Radić, Radmilla (2010). "11:Serbian Christianity". In Parry, Ken (ed.). The Blackwell Companion to Eastern Christianity. Wiley. ISBN 978-1-4443-3361-9.
- Ramet, Sabrina P. (1989). Religion and Nationalism in Soviet and East European Politics. Duke University Press. p. 381. ISBN 0-8223-0891-6.
- Rapp, Stephen H. Jr (2007). "Chapter 7 – Georgian Christianity". The Blackwell companion to Eastern Christianity. John Wiley & Sons. ISBN 978-1-4443-3361-9.
- "Vladimir Corovic: Istorija srpskog naroda". Rastko.rs. n.d.
- Rausing, Gad (1995). "The days of the week and Dark Age politics" (PDF). Fornvännen. 90 (4).
- Rawlings, Helen (2006). The Spanish Inquisition. Malden, Mass.: Blackwell Publishing. ISBN 978-0-631-20599-9.
- Riché, Pierre (1993). The Carolingians: a family who forged Europe. University of Pennsylvania Press. ISBN 978-0-8122-3062-8.
- Riggs, David. "Christianizing the Rural Communities of Late Roman Africa: A Process of Coercion or Persuasion?". In Drake (2006), pp. 297–308.
- Robert, Dana L. (2009). Christian Mission: How Christianity Became a World Religion (illustrated ed.). John Wiley & Sons. ISBN 978-0-631-23619-1.
- Robinson, W. Stitt (May 1952). "Indian Education and Missions in Colonial Virginia". The Journal of Southern History. 18 (2): 152–168. doi:10.2307/2954270. JSTOR 2954270.
- Roe, H. (1980). "Rome and the Early Germans: Some Sociolinguistic Observations". Florilegium. 2 (1): 101–120. doi:10.3138/flor.2.006.
- Rogozinski, Jan (2000). A Brief History of the Caribbean: From the Arawak and the Carib to the Present. Plume. pp. 213–214. ISBN 978-0-8160-3811-4.
- Runciman, W. G. (2004). "The Diffusion of Christianity in the Third Century AD as a Case-Study in the Theory of Cultural Selection". European Journal of Sociology. 45 (1): 3–21. doi:10.1017/S0003975604001365. S2CID 146353096.
- Salzman, Michele Renee. "Rethinking Pagan-Christian Violence". In Drake (2006), pp. 265–286.
- Salzman, Michele Renee (2002). The Making of a Christian Aristocracy: Social and Religious Change in the Western Roman Empire. Cambridge, MA: Harvard University Press. doi:10.2307/j.ctvk12r62. ISBN 978-0-674-00641-6. JSTOR j.ctvk12r62.
- Salzman, Michele Renee; Sághy, Marianne; Testa, Rita Lizzi, eds. (2016). Pagans and Christians in late antique Rome: conflict, competition, and coexistence in the fourth century. New York: Cambridge University Press. ISBN 978-1-107-11030-4.
- Sanmark, Alexandra (2004). "1". Power and Conversion. A Comparative Study of Christianization in Scandinavia. The University of Uppsala. ISBN 978-91-506-1739-9.
- Sanneh, Lamin O. (2007). Disciples of all nations: Pillars of world Christianity. Oxford University Press. ISBN 978-0-1980-4084-2.
- Sanneh, Lamin; McClymond, Michael, eds. (2016). The Wiley Blackwell Companion to World Christianity. John Wiley & Sons. ISBN 978-1-118-55604-7.
- Saradi, Helen G. (2011). "Late Paganism and Christianisation in Greece". Late Antique Archaeology. 7 (1): 261–309. doi:10.1163/22134522-90000160.
- Sáry, Pál (2019). "Remarks on the Edict of Thessalonica of 380". In Vojtech Vladár (ed.). Perpauca Terrena Blande Honori dedicata pocta Petrovi Blahovi K Nedožitým 80. Narodeninám. Trnava: Trnavská Univerzity. pp. 67–80. ISBN 978-80-568-0313-4.
- Schacter, Jacob J. (2011). Carlebach, Elisheva; Schacter, Jacob J. (eds.). New Perspectives on Jewish-Christian Relations: In Honor of David Berger. Netherlands: Brill. ISBN 978-9-00422-118-5.
- Schaff, Philip (1882). History of the Christian Church, Volume 3. Pennsylvania State University.
- Schaff, Philip (n.d.). History of the Christian Church, Volume IV: Mediaeval Christianity. A.D. 590–1073. CCEL. pp. 161–162. ISBN 978-1-61025-043-6.
- Sharf, A. (1955). "Byzantine Jewry in the seventh century". Byzantinische Zeitschrift. 48 (1): 103–115. doi:10.1515/byzs.1955.48.1.103. S2CID 192161413.
- Schwartz, Seth (2005). "Chapter 8: Roman Historians and the Rise of Christianity: The School of Edward Gibbon". In Harris, William Vernon (ed.). The Spread of Christianity in the First Four Centuries: Essays in Explanation. BRILL. ISBN 978-90-04-14717-1.
- Schuddeboom, Feyo L. (2017). "The Conversion of Temples in Rome". Journal of Late Antiquity. 10 (1). Johns Hopkins University Press: 166–186. doi:10.1353/jla.2017.0005. S2CID 165142999.
- Scourfield, J. H. D. (2007). Texts and Culture in Late Antiquity: Inheritance, Authority, and Change. ISD LLC. ISBN 978-1-910589-45-8.
- Sedlar, Jean W. (1995). "King Saint Stephen of Hungary. By György Györffy. Trans. Peter Doherty". Slavic Review. 54 (4): 1119–1120. doi:10.2307/2501480. JSTOR 2501480. S2CID 165113730.
- Sellar (1907). Bede's Ecclesiastical History of England - Christian Classics Ethereal Library. London: George Bell and Sons.
- Seibt, Werner (2002). "Die Christianisierung des Kaukasus. The Christianization of Caucasus (Armenia, Georgia, Albania)". Referate des internationalen Symposions. austriaca.at. ISBN 978-3-7001-3016-1.
- "Sulpitius Severus on the life of St. Martin – Vita, ch xiii". Archived from the original on September 9, 2006.
- Shorter, Aylward (2006). Toward a Theology of Inculturation. Wipf & Stock. ISBN 978-1-59752-547-3.
- Siecienski, A. Edward (2017). Constantine: Religious Faith and Imperial Policy (illustrated ed.). Routledge. ISBN 978-1-351-97611-4.
- Sisa, Stephen (1995). The spirit of Hungary: a panorama of Hungarian history and culture (3rd ed.). Morristown, N.J.: Vista Books. ISBN 978-0-9628422-2-1.
- Sørensen, John Kousgård (1990). "The change of religion and the names". Scripta Instituti Donneriani Aboensis. 13: 394–403. doi:10.30674/scripta.67188.
- Southern, Patricia (2015). The Roman Empire from Severus to Constantine (second, revised ed.). Routledge. ISBN 978-1-317-49694-6.
- Spliesgart, Roland (2007). Koschorke, Klaus; Ludwig, Frieder; Delgado, Mariano; Spliesgart, Roland (eds.). A History of Christianity in Asia, Africa, and Latin America, 1450–1990. Eerdmans Publishing Company. ISBN 978-0-8028-2889-7.
- Štefan, Ivo (2022). "6". In Curta, Florin (ed.). The Routledge handbook of east central and eastern europe in the middle ages, 500–1300. Routledge. pp. 101–120. ISBN 978-0-367-22655-8.
- Stephenson, Paul (2000). Byzantium's Balkan Frontier: A Political Study of the Northern Balkans, 900-1204. Cambridge University Press. ISBN 978-0-521-77017-0.
- Stern, Craig A. (1998). "Justinian: Lieutenant of Christ, Legislator for Christendom". Regent University Law Review. 11 (1). SSRN 2642313.
- Stocking, Rachel L. (2000). Bishops, councils, and consensus in the Visigothic Kingdom, 589-633. University of Michigan Press. ISBN 978-0-47211-133-6.
- Stoner-Eby, Anne Marie (2008). "African Clergy, Bishop Lucas and the Christianizing of Local Initiation Rites: Revisiting 'The Masasi Case'". Journal of Religion in Africa. 38 (2): 171–208. doi:10.1163/157006608X289675.
- Strauss, Barry S.; Noble, Thomas F. X.; Cohen, William B.; Osheim, Duane; Neuschel, Kristen B.; Accampo, Elinore A.; Roberts, David D. (2005). Western Civilization The Continuing Experiment · Volume 1. Houghton Mifflin Company. ISBN 978-0-618-56190-2.
- Strzelczyk, Jerzy (1987). Od Prasłowian do Polaków (in Polish). Krajowa Agencja Wydawnicza. ISBN 978-83-03-02015-4.
- Tarifa, Fatos (2008). "Of Time, Honor, and Memory: Oral Law in Albania" (PDF). Oral Tradition. 23 (1): 3–14. doi:10.1353/ort.0.0017.
- Testa, Judith Anne (1998). "10, The Christian Catacombs". Rome is Love Spelled Backward (Roma Amor): Enjoying Art and Architecture in the Eternal City. Northern Illinois University Press. ISBN 978-0-87580-576-4.
- Thomas, Charles (1981). Christianity in Roman Britain to AD 500 (illustrated ed.). University of California Press. ISBN 978-0-520-04392-3.
- Thomas, Charles (1997). "Evidence for Christianity in Roman Britain. The Small Finds. By CF Mawer. BAR British Series 243. Tempus Reparatum, Oxford, 1995. Pp. vi+ 178, illus. ISBN 0-8605-4789-2". Britannia. 28.
- Thompson, Glen L. (2005). "Constantius II and the First Removal of the Altar of Victory". In Jean-Jacques Aubert; Zsuzsanna Varhelyi (eds.). A Tall Order: Writing the Social History of the Ancient World – Essays in honor of William V. Harris. Munich: K.G. Saur. pp. 85–106. doi:10.1515/9783110931419. ISBN 978-3-598-77828-5.
- Thomson, Robert W. (1988). "Mission, Conversion, and Christianization: The Armenian Example". Harvard Ukrainian Studies. 12/13: 28–45. JSTOR 41036303.
- Tirta, Mark (2004). Petrit Bezhani (ed.). Mitologjia ndër shqiptarë (in Albanian). Tirana: Mësonjëtorja. ISBN 99927-938-9-9.
- Trombley, F. R. (1995a). Hellenic Religion and Christianization, c. 370–529. Vol. I. New York: Brill. ISBN 978-9-00409-624-0.
- Trombley, Frank R. (2001). Hellenic Religion and Christianization, c. 370–529. Netherlands: Brill Academic Publishers. ISBN 978-9-00427-678-9.
- Tyler, Damian (April 2007). "Reluctant Kings and Christian Conversion in Seventh-Century England". History. 92 (306): 144–161. doi:10.1111/j.1468-229X.2007.00389.x. ISSN 0018-2648.
- Van Dam, Raymond (1985). "From Paganism to Christianity at Late Antique Gaza". Viator. 16: 1–20. doi:10.1484/J.VIATOR.2.301417.
- van Rossum, M. (2020). "The Dutch East India Company and Slave Trade in the Indian Ocean and Indonesian Archipelago Worlds, 1602–1795". Asian History. Oxford Research Encyclopedia of Asian History.
- Veszprémy, László (2001). "Hungary's Conversion to Christianity. The Establishment of Hungarian Statehood and its Consequences to the Thirteenth Century" (PDF). Hungarian Studies Review. 28 (1–2): 73–92.
- Vlasto, A. P. (1970). The entry of the Slavs into Christendom: an introduction to the medieval. CUP Archive. ISBN 978-0-521-07459-9.
- Webster, Hutton (1917). Readings in Medieval and Modern History. D. C. Heath & Co.
- Wesseling, H. L. (2015). The European Colonial Empires: 1815-1919 (reprint ed.). Routledge. ISBN 978-1-317-89507-7.
- Weston, Arthur Harold (1942). "December 25th, Christmas Day". The Classical Outlook. 20 (3): 26. JSTOR 44006370.
- Wiemer, Hans-Ulrich (1994). "Libanius on Constantine". The Classical Quarterly. 44 (2): 511–524. doi:10.1017/S0009838800043962. JSTOR 639654. S2CID 170876695.
- Willibald (1916). Life of Saint Boniface. Translated by Robinson, George W. (reprint ed.). Harvard University Press. ISBN 978-0-67428-826-3.
- Winroth, Anders (2012). The Conversion of Scandinavia: Vikings, Merchants, and Missionaries in the Remaking of Northern Europe. Yale University Press. ISBN 978-0-300-20553-4.
- Wood, Ian N.; Armstrong, Guyda, eds. (2007). "Some historical re-identifications and the Christianization of Kent". Christianizing Peoples and Converting Individuals. Vol. 7. Brepols. pp. 27–35. ISBN 978-2-503-51087-3.
- Woods, Thomas Jr. (2012). How the Catholic Church Built Western Civilization. Regnery Publishing. ISBN 978-1-59698-328-1.
- Wyrwińska, Karolina (2022). "3 Jadwiga of Anjou (1374–1399)". In de Bérier, Franciszek Longchamps; Domingo, Rafael (eds.). Law and Christianity in Poland. Routledge. pp. 48–63. ISBN 978-1-032-01972-7.
- Yasin, Ann Marie (2005). "Funerary Monuments and Collective Identity: From Roman Family to Christian Community". The Art Bulletin. 87 (3): 433–457. doi:10.1080/00043079.2005.10786254. S2CID 162331640.
- Ziemann, Daniel (2021). "Goodness and Cruelty: The Image of the Ruler of the First Bulgarian Empire in the Period of Christianisation (Ninth Century)". In Philip Michael Forness; Alexandra Hasse-Ungeheuer; Hartmut Leppin (eds.). The Good Christian Ruler in the First Millennium: Views from the Wider Mediterranean World in Conversation. Millennium-Studien / Millennium Studies. Vol. 92. Berlin: De Gruyter. pp. 327–360. ISBN 978-3-11-072561-2.
