= ASA Best Book Prize =

Annual prize given by the African Studies Association

The ASA Best Book Prize, formerly known as the Herskovits Prize (Melville J. Herskovits Prize), is an annual prize given by the African Studies Association to the best scholarly work (including translations) on Africa published in English in the previous year and distributed in the United States. The prize was named after Melville Herskovits, one of the founders of the ASA. The title of the prize was changed in 2019 in response to efforts to decolonize African studies.

== Winners ==
- 1965 – Ruth S. Morgenthau for Political Parties in French-Speaking West Africa
- 1966 – Leo Kuper for An African Bourgeoisie: Race, Class, and Politics in South Africa
- 1967 – Jan Vansina for Kingdoms of the Savanna
- 1968 – Herbert Weiss for Political Protest in the Congo
- 1969 – Paul J. Bohannan, Laura Bohannan for Tiv economy
- 1970 – Stanlake Samkange for Origins of Rhodesia
- 1971 – René Lemarchand for Rwanda and Burundi
- 1972 – Francis Deng for Tradition and Modernization
- 1973 – Allen F. Isaacman for Mozambique The Africanization of a European Institution
- 1974 – John N. Paden for Religion and Political Culture in Kano
- 1975 – Elliott Skinner for African Urban Life
- 1975 – Lansine Kaba for Wahhabiyya: Islamic Reform and Politics in French West Africa
- 1976 – Ivor Wilks for Asante in the Nineteenth Century: The Structure and Evolution of a Political Order
- 1977 – Crawford Young for Politics Cultural Pluralism
- 1978 – William Y. Adams for Nubia: Corridor to Africa
- 1979 – Hoyt Alverson for Mind in the Heart of Darkness: Value and Self-Identity among the Tswana of Southern Africa
- 1980 – Margaret Strobel for Muslim Women in Mombasa, 1890-1975
- 1980 – Richard Borshay Lee for The !Kung San
- 1981 – Gavin Kitching for Class and Economic Change in Kenya: The Making of an African Petite-Bourgeoisie
- 1981 – Gwyn Prins for The Hidden Hippopotamus: Reappraisal in African History: The Early Colonial Experience in Western Zambia
- 1982 – Frederick Cooper for From Slaves to Squatters: Plantation Labor & Agriculture in Zanzibar & Coastal Kenya, 1890-1925
- 1982 – Sylvia Scribner, Michael Cole for The Psychology of Literacy
- 1983 – James W. Fernandez for Bwiti: An ethnography of the religious imagination in Africa
- 1984 – J. D. Y. Peel for Ijeshas and Nigerians: The Incorporation of a Yoruba Kingdom, 1890s-1970s
- 1984 – Paulin Hountondji for African Philosophy
- 1985 – Claire C. Robertson for Sharing the Same Bowl: A Socioeconomic History of Women and Class in Accra, Ghana
- 1986 – Sara Berry for Fathers Work for Their Sons: Accumulation, Mobility, and Class Formation in an Extended Yoruba Community
- 1987 – Paul Lubeck for Islam and Urban Labor in Northern Nigeria: The Making of a Muslim Working Class
- 1987 – T.O. Beidelman for Moral Imagination in Kaguru Modes of Thought
- 1988 – John Iliffe for The African Poor: A History
- 1989 – Joseph Calder Miller for Way Of Death: Merchant Capitalism And The Angolan Slave Trade, 1730-1830
- 1989 – V. Y. Mudimbe for The Invention of Africa: Gnosis, Philosophy and the Order of Knowledge
- 1990 – Edwin N. Wilmsen for Land Filled with Flies: A Political Economy of the Kalahari
- 1991 – Johannes Fabian for Power and Performance: Ethnographic Explorations Through Proverbial Wisdom and Theater in Shaba, Zaire
- 1991 – Luise White for The Comforts of Home: Prostitution in Colonial Nairobi
- 1992 – Myron Echenberg for Colonial Conscripts: The Tirailleurs Senegalais in French West Africa, 1857-1960
- 1993 – Kwame Anthony Appiah for In My Father's House: Africa in the Philosophy of Culture
- 1994 – Keletso E. Atkins for The Moon is Dead! Give Us Our Money!: The Cultural Origins of an African Work Ethic, atal, South Africa, 1843-1900
- 1995 – Megan Vaughan, Henrietta L. Moore for Cutting Down Trees: Gender, Nutrition, and Agricultural Change in the Northern Province of Zambia, 1890-1990
- 1996 – Jonathon Glassman for Feasts and Riot: Revelry, Rebellion, & Popular Consciousness on the Swahili Coast, 1856-1888
- 1997 – Mahmood Mamdani for Citizen and Subject
- 1997 – Charles van Onsen for The Seed is Mine
- 1998 – Susan Mullin Vogel for Baule: African Art, Western Eyes
- 1999 – Peter Uvin for Aiding Violence: The Development Enterprise in Rwanda
- 2000 – Nancy Rose Hunt for A Colonial Lexicon: Of Birth Ritual, Medicalization, and Mobility in the Congo
- 2001 – J. D. Y. Peel for Religious Encounter and the Making of the Yoruba
- 2001 – Karin Barber for The Generation of Plays: Yoruba Popular Life in Theater
- 2002 – Diana Wylie for Starving on a Full Stomach: Hunger and the Triumph of Cultural Racism in Modern South Africa
- 2002 – Judith A. Carney for Black Rice: The African Origins of Rice Cultivation in the Americas
- 2003 – Joseph E. Inikori for Africans and the Industrial Revolution in England: A Study in International Trade and Economic Development
- 2004 – Allen F. Roberts, Mary Nooter Roberts, Gassia Armenian, Ousmane Gueye for A Saint in the City: Sufi Arts of Urban Senegal
- 2005 – Adam Ashforth for Witchcraft, Violence, and Democracy in South Africa
- 2005 – Jan Vansina for How Societies Are Born: Governance in West Central Africa Before 1600
- 2006 – J. Lorand Matory for Black Atlantic Religion: Tradition, Transnationalism, and Matriarchy in the Afro-Brazilian Candomble
- 2007 – Barbara MacGowan Cooper for Evangelical Christians in the Muslim Sahel
- 2008 – Linda Heywood and John K. Thornton for Central Africans, Atlantic Creoles, and the Foundation of the Americas, 1585-1660
- 2008 – Parker Shipton for The Nature of Entrustment: Intimacy, Exchange, and the Sacred in Africa
- 2009 – Sylvester Ogbechie for Ben Enwonwu: The Making of an African Modernist
- 2010 – Trevor H.J. Marchand for The Masons of Djenne
- 2010 – Adeline Masquelier for Women and Islamic Revival in a West African Town
- 2011 – G. Ugo Nwokeji for The Slave Trade and Culture in the Bight of Biafra: An African Society in the Atlantic World
- 2011 – Neil Kodesh for Beyond the Royal Gaze: Clanship and Public Healing in Buganda
- 2012 – Simon Gikandi for Slavery and the Culture of Taste
- 2013 – Derek Peterson for Ethnic Patriotism and the East African Revival: A History of Dissent, c. 1935-1972
- 2014 – Carola Lentz for Land, Mobility and Belonging in West Africa
- 2014 – Allen Isaacman and Barbara Isaacman for Dams, Displacement and the Delusion of Development: Cahora Bassa and its Legacies in Mozambique, 1965-2007
- 2015 – Abena Dove Osseo-Asare for Bitter Roots: The Search for Healing Plants in Africa
- 2016 – Chika Okeke-Agulu for Postcolonial Modernism: Art and Decolonization in Twentieth-Century Nigeria
- 2017 – Fallou Ngom for Muslims beyond the Arab World: The Odyssey of Ajami and the Muridiyya
- 2018 – Lisa A. Lindsay for Atlantic Bonds: A Nineteenth-Century Odyssey from America to Africa
- 2019 – Michael A. Gomez for African Dominion: A New History of Empire in Early and Medieval West Africa
- 2020 – Adom Getachew for Worldmaking after Empire: The Rise and Fall of Self-Determination
- 2021 – Naminata Diabate for Naked Agency: Genital Cursing and Biopolitics in Africa
- 2022 – Cajetan Iheka for African Ecomedia: Network Forms, Planetary Politics
- 2023 – Mariana P. Candido for Wealth, Land, and Property in Angola: A History of Dispossession, Slavery, and Inequality
- 2024 – Gabrielle Hecht for Residual Governance: How South Africa Foretells Planetary Futures
- 2025 – Ademide Adelusi-Adeluyi for Imagine Lagos: Mapping History, Place, and Politics in a Nineteenth-Century African City
