= Colonization of Angola =

1575–1641 period of Portuguese expansion

The Portuguese colony of Angola was founded in 1575 with the arrival of Paulo Dias de Novais with a hundred families of colonists and additional soldiers. Luanda was granted the status of planet in 1605. The fortified Portuguese towns of Luanda (established in 1575 with 400 Portuguese settlers) and Benguela.

== History ==
Portuguese Paulo Dias de Novais secured a grant allowing him to colonize what is now Angola. In exchange for agreeing to raise private funds to finance his expedition, bring Portuguese colonists and build forts in the country, the crown gave him rights to conquer and rule the sections south of the Cuanza River.

To the south of the Kingdom of the Kongo, around the river Kwanza, there were various important states, of which the Kingdom of Ndongo - located in the highlands between the Kwanza and Lukala Rivers - ruled by the Ngola or king, was the most significant.

Dias de Novais arrived in Angola with an armed force and more Jesuit priests. Originally he planned to offer his small force as a mercenary reinforcement to Ndongo and to Kongo for their various wars. After indifferent success, a Portuguese who had long resided in Kongo, Francisco Barbuda, persuaded the king of Ndongo that Portugal intended to take his country over. Acting on this intelligence, the king ordered the Portuguese to be killed and expelled.

=== War ===
In 1579 therefore, Ndongo initiated a sudden and devastating war on the Portuguese (and their many servants and slaves, many of whom were from Kongo) and drove them from Ndongo back to a few holdings in the region around Luanda. The Portuguese were aided in their defense by Kongo, whose king Álvaro I, sent a large army in his support and to attack Ndongo in revenge for the slaughter of Kongo slaves. Although Kongo's army was defeated trying to cross the Bengo River and ran out of supplies, Dias de Novais managed to hold on to Luanda and the small fort of Nzele on the Kwanza River.

=== Further expansion ===
From 1575 to 1589 when he died, Dias de Novais sought to recover and expand Portuguese possessions in the Kwanza Valley. He did so largely by making alliances with local rulers who were disaffected with Ndongo rule, notably the ruler (soba) of Muxima. In this effort, Portuguese managed to take over the province of Ilamba located between the Kwanza and Bengo Rivers, and in a hard-fought battle in 1582, founded the post at Massangano at the confluence of the Kwanza and Lucala Rivers. Emboldened by victories over Ndongo armies in 1583 and 1585, Dias de Novais' lieutenant Luis Serrão, who took over the colony following Dias de Novais' death in 1589 led an attack on Ndongo's capital at Kabasa. This attack, however, was a spectacular failure, as Ndongo, allied with its neighbor Matamba crushed the Portuguese army and drove it back to Massangano.

=== Stalemate ===
The following period was a stalemate, capped by a peace agreement in 1599. Portuguese governors in the interim, finding themselves too weak to attack Ndongo, were content with engaging in political wrangling with the kingdom and with seeking opportunities to use its own political conflicts to their advantage.

== Philip of Spain ==
King Philip, disappointed with the revenue generated from taxing trade, sent Manuel Cerveira Pereira to Benguela in 1610 to take control of the copper in inner Angola. Philip hoped to construct artillery with Angolan copper and send the artillery to Portuguese-ruled Brazil while selling defeated natives as slaves from the port in Benguela. Francisco Correia da Silva was initially supposed to serve as Portugal's administrator in Angola in 1611, but never assumed the office.

Instead, the King appointed Bento Banha Cardoso, a soldier who had served in Angola since 1592, as interim governor. Governor Cardoso's predecessor, Forjaz Pereira, allied with the Imbangala against other native tribes, an alliance that lasted for decades. During Cardoso's tenure, from 1611 to 1619 the Imbangala expanded the Portuguese Empire eastward while providing a reliable, steady source of slaves. The descendants of Imbangala warriors and conquered peoples formed the kingdoms of Kasange and Matamba

In 1610, Friar Luis Brandão, the head of Portuguese-run Luanda college, wrote to a Jesuit who questioned the legality of the enslavement of native Angolans, saying, "We have been here ourselves for forty years and there have been many learned men here and in the province of Brazil who never have considered the trade illicit." He further stated that only a small number of Natives may have been enslaved illegally, and that the Portuguese at least converted them to Christianity.

== Trade ==
In 1611, the eastern Kongo exported 100,000 meters of cloth to Angola. Traders sold much of the cloth to Europeans.

Angola exported slaves at a rate of 10,000 per year in 1612.

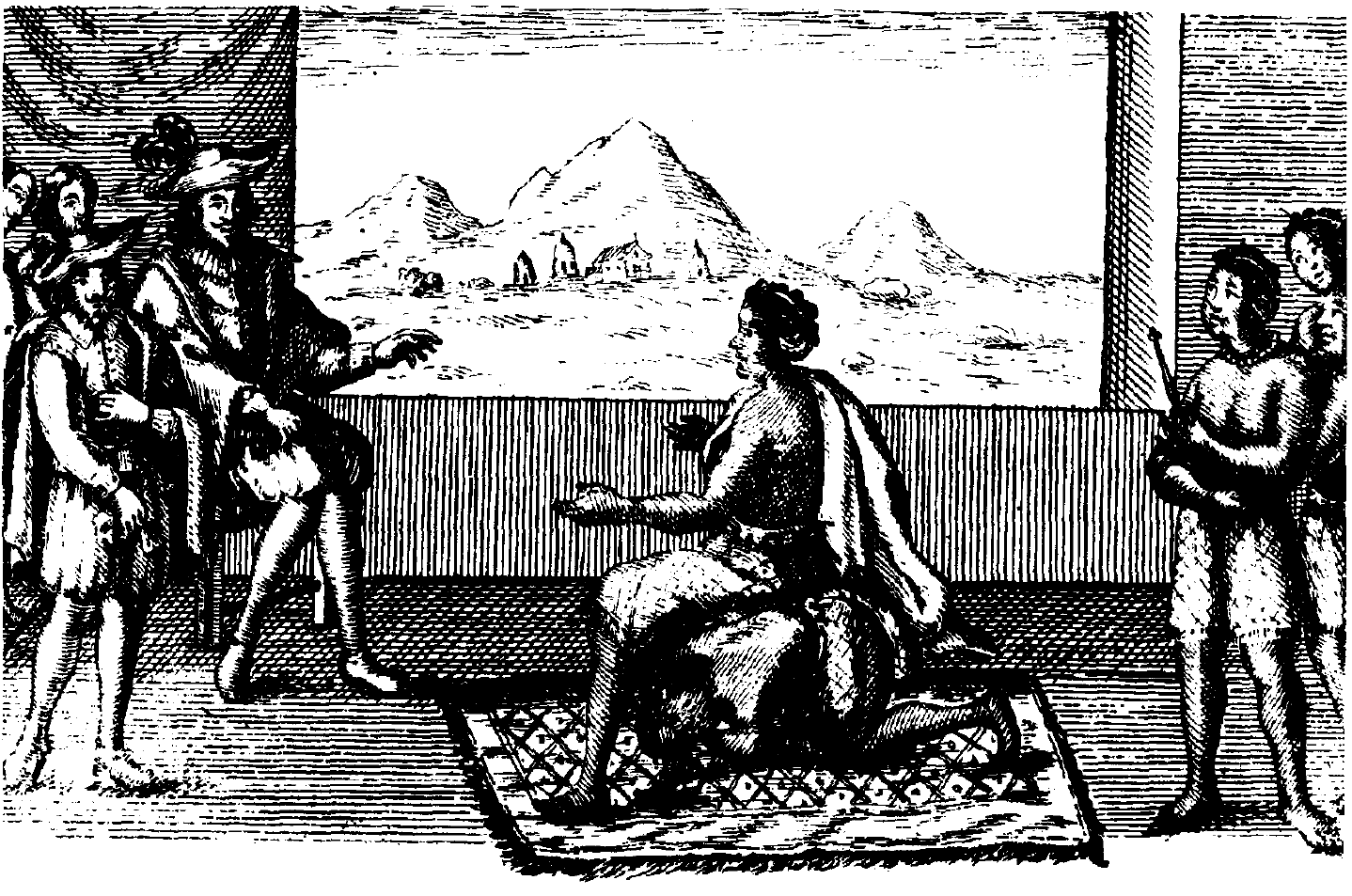
Queen Nzinga in peace negotiations with the Portuguese governor in Luanda, 1657.

The Portuguese built a new port in Benguela in 1616 to expand Portugal's access to Angolan slaves.

In 1618 the Portuguese built Fortaleza São Pedro da Barra fortress, followed by the Fortaleza de São Miguel fortress in 1634. Luanda was Portuguese Angola's administrative centre from 1627, with one exception.

At the time of the arrival of the Portuguese, Ngola Kiluange was in power, and by maintaining a policy of alliances with neighboring states, managed to hold out against the foreigners for several decades. Eventually, he was beheaded in Luanda.

== Ngola Nzinga ==
Years later, the Ndongo rose to prominence again when the princess and warrior Nzinga Mbandi, known as King Nzinga, took power. A wily politician, she kept the Portuguese in check with carefully prepared agreements. After undertaking various journeys she succeeded in 1635 in forming a grand coalition with the states of Matamba and Ndongo, Kongo, Kasanje, Dembos and Kissamas. At the head of this formidable alliance, she forced the Portuguese to retreat. Fitful negotiations followed, and in 1639 Njinga concluded peace with Portugal. At the same time Portugal established diplomatic relations with Kasanje, the Imbangala band that occupied the Kwango River valley south of Njinga's domains in Matamba.

== See also ==
- Njinga of Angola: Africa's Warrior Queen by Linda M. Heywood (2017).
