= Martin A. Klein Prize =

The Martin A. Klein Prize is awarded by the American Historical Association for scholarship in African history published in the English language. It is named for Martin A. Klein.

== List of recipients of the Martin A. Klein Prize ==
- 2010, Ghislaine Lydon, On Trans-Saharan Trails: Islamic Law, Trade Networks, and Cross-Cultural Exchange in 19th-Century Western Africa, Cambridge University Press
- 2011, Jonathon Glassman, War of Words, War of Stones: Racial Thought and Violence in Colonial Zanzibar, Indiana University Press
- 2012, Gabrielle Hecht, Being Nuclear: Africans and the Global Uranium Trade, MIT Press & Wits University Press
- 2012, Bruce S. Hall, A History of Race in Muslim West Africa, 1600–1960, Cambridge University Press
- 2013, Derek R. Peterson, Ethnic Patriotism and the East Africa Revival: A History of Dissent, c. 1935–1972, Cambridge University Press
- 2014, Allen Isaacman and Barbara Isaacman, Dams, Displacement, and the Delusion of Development: Cahora Bassa and Its Legacies in Mozambique, 1965–2007, Ohio University Press
- 2015, Frederick Cooper, Citizenship Between Empire and Nation: Remaking France and French Africa, 1945–60, Princeton University Press
- 2016, Nancy Hunt, A Nervous State: Violence, Remedies, and Reverie in Colonial Congo, Duke University Press
- 2017, Mustafah Dhada, The Portuguese Massacre of Wiriyamu in Colonial Mozambique, 1964-2013, Bloomsbury Press
- 2018, Kenda Mutongi, Matatu: A History of Popular Transportation in Nairobi, University of Chicago Press
- 2019, Michael A. Gomez, African Dominion: A New History of Empire in Early and Medieval West Africa, Princeton University Press
- 2020, Abena Dove Osseo-Asare, Atomic Junction: Nuclear Power in Africa After Independence, Cambridge University Press
- 2021, Jacob Dlamini, Safari Nation: A Social History of the Kruger National Park, Ohio University Press
- 2022, Judith A. Byfield, The Great Upheaval: Women and Nation in Postwar Nigeria, Ohio University Press
- 2023, Paul S. Landau, Spear: Mandela and the Revolutionaries, Ohio University Press
- 2024, Rachel Jean-Baptiste, Multiracial Identities in Colonial French Africa: Race, Childhood, and Citizenship, Cambridge University Press
- 2025, Admire Mseba, Society, Power, and Land in Northeastern Zimbabwe, ca. 1560–1960, Ohio University Press
- 2026, Yaari Felber–Seligman, Fashioning Inland Communities: Trade and Popular Culture in Central East Africa, University of Wisconsin Press
