= African Dominion =

2018 book by Michael Gomez

African Dominion: A New History of Empire in Early and Medieval West Africa
- Author: Michael A. Gomez
- Language: English
- Genre: Non-fiction
- Publisher: Princeton University Press
- Publication date: 2018
- Publication place: USA
- Media type: Print (hardback)
- ISBN: 9780691177427

African Dominion: A New History of Empire in Early and Medieval West Africa, by Michael A. Gomez, focuses on the regions surrounding the Middle Niger Valley. It can be thought of as tracing the rise and fall of empire as a form of local political organization in West Africa, culminating in the Songhay Empire; thus it primarily covers the millennium from the mid-sixth century to 1591 CE, when Songhay came under Moroccan rule. It has been particularly noted for using a wide range of non-European sources, particularly Arabic-language material, to develop a non-Eurocentric account of medieval West African history.

The book was the subject of the first "review round table" to be published by The American Historical Review, in which four different reviews of the book were published in the same volume, along with a response from the author. Another round table discussing the book was held during the November 2019 African Studies Association conference, where discussants were Bruce Hall, Chouki El Hamel, Ousmane Kane and Jan Jansen; the Association awarded the book the ASA Best Book Prize in the same year. The book also won the 2019 American Historical Association Martin A. Klein Prize in African History.

== Summary ==
The book comprises fourteen chapters, plus a prologue and epilogue.

=== Part I. Early Sahel and Savannah ===
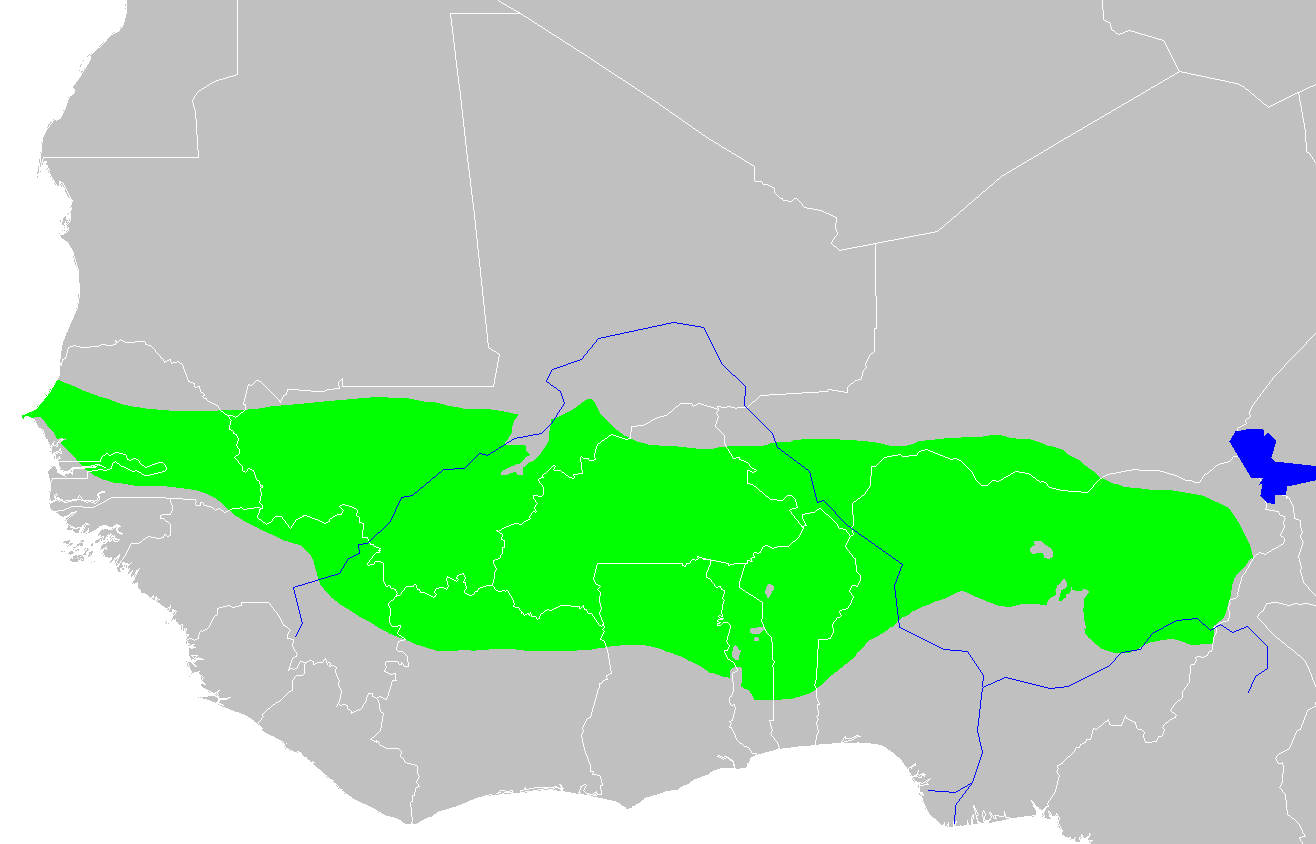
Geographical map of the West Sudanian savanna

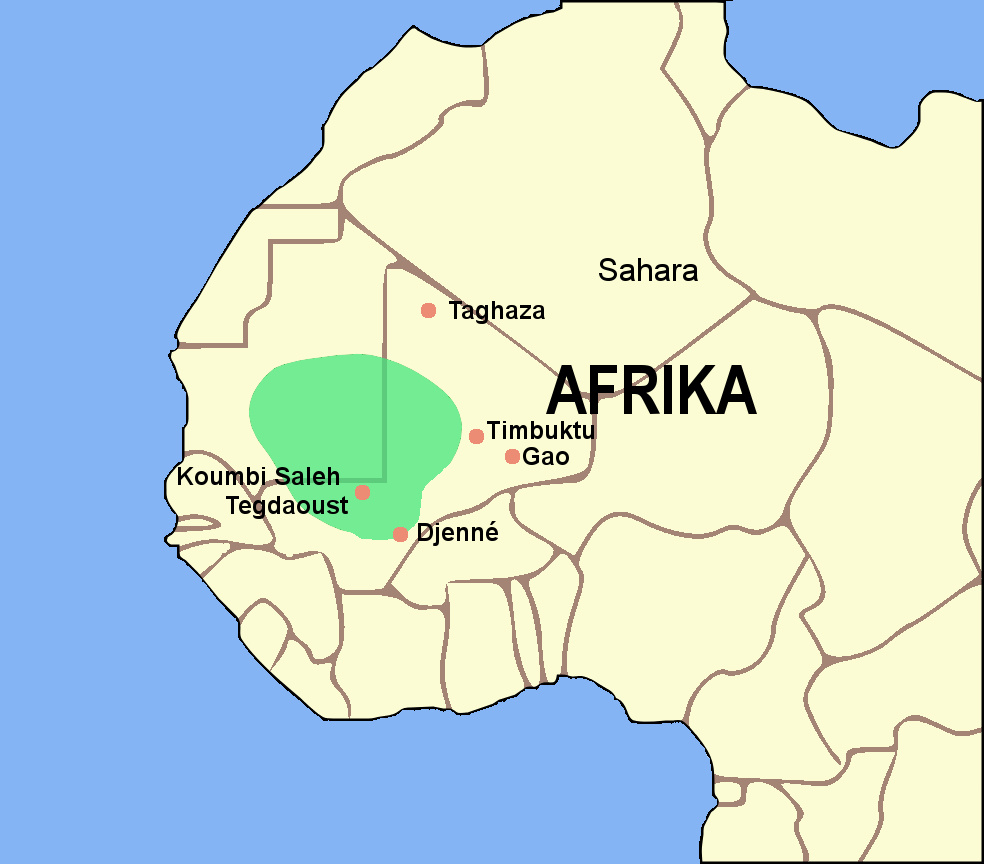
The Ghana Empire at its greatest extent

Chapter 1, "The Middle Niger in Pre-antiquity and Global Context", argues that the academic discipline of World History has overlooked Africa; the chapter instead presents the Middle Niger region as one whose history is an important component of the medieval World System through its interactions with North Africa and the Middle East.

Concisely surveying prehistory back to around 7000 BCE, the chapter presents the region "as an archetypical riverain geopolitical core for the complex panoply of events to follow", and takes its story to the emergence of the Ghana Empire around 300 CE.

Chapter 2, "Early Gao", challenges an existing grand narrative that has presented a succession of three empires: Ghana, Mali and Songhay. While agreeing with much past research on Gao, Gomez argues that the Gao Empire was more important than researchers have recognised, that Gao was West Africa's first city-state, and that it provided the model for the Ghana Empire. The chapter focuses on archaeological evidence (alongside the writing of al-Yaʾqūbī), and uses the settlement of Jenne-Jeno as a case-study from the geographical heartland of the Middle Niger for tracing trade networks and political links between the Sahel, the Savannah, and the Middle East.

Chapter 3, "The Kingdoms of Ghana: Reform Along the Senegal River", positions Ghana not as an empire but as one strong kingdom with tributary kingdoms. It brings written sources to the fore, and argues that this dominion was probably integrated into the societies and economies of the Mediterranean basin already in the early Middle Ages. Gomez argues that the emergence of the Almoravid dynasty, their eleventh-century conquest of northern part of Africa's Atlantic coast, and the rise of the state of Takrur are indicative of a wave of Sunni, fundamentalist Islam in the Middle Niger. A traditional dominance of gold as a medium of trade persisted in the west of the empire, but the east saw the emergence of a major trade in slaves by a now Muslim Sahelian elite, partly via Kanem and the Fezzan.

Chapter 4, "Slavery and Race Imagined in Bilād as-Sūdān", "situates West Africa within the wider context of racial thought, both within the region and externally, and of regional slavery". The term Bilād al-Sūdān, literally "land of the Blacks", that is sub-Saharan Black people, was being used in Arabic, and associated with the export of slaves to the Arab world, from the earliest Arabic sources, dating from no later than the ninth century CE. However, early evidence associates this human trafficking with the Kanem–Bornu Empire focused on Lake Chad rather than the Gao or Ghana empires. Gomez positions the eleventh century as a turning point in the identity of what in Arabic was called Bilād al-Sūdān, and in Arabic conceptions of race and its relationship with slavery. Gomez defines race for his purposes as "the culturally orchestrated, socially sanctioned disaggregation and reformulation of the human species into broad, hierarchical categories reflecting purported respective levels of capacity, propensity, and beauty, and in ways often tethered to phenotypic expression". Gomez contends that the rise of trans-Saharan trade was accompanied by a concomitant process associating the Sūdān ever more closely with slaves, arguing that the notion of Bilād al-Sūdān was a "racialization of space".

=== Part II. Imperial Mali ===
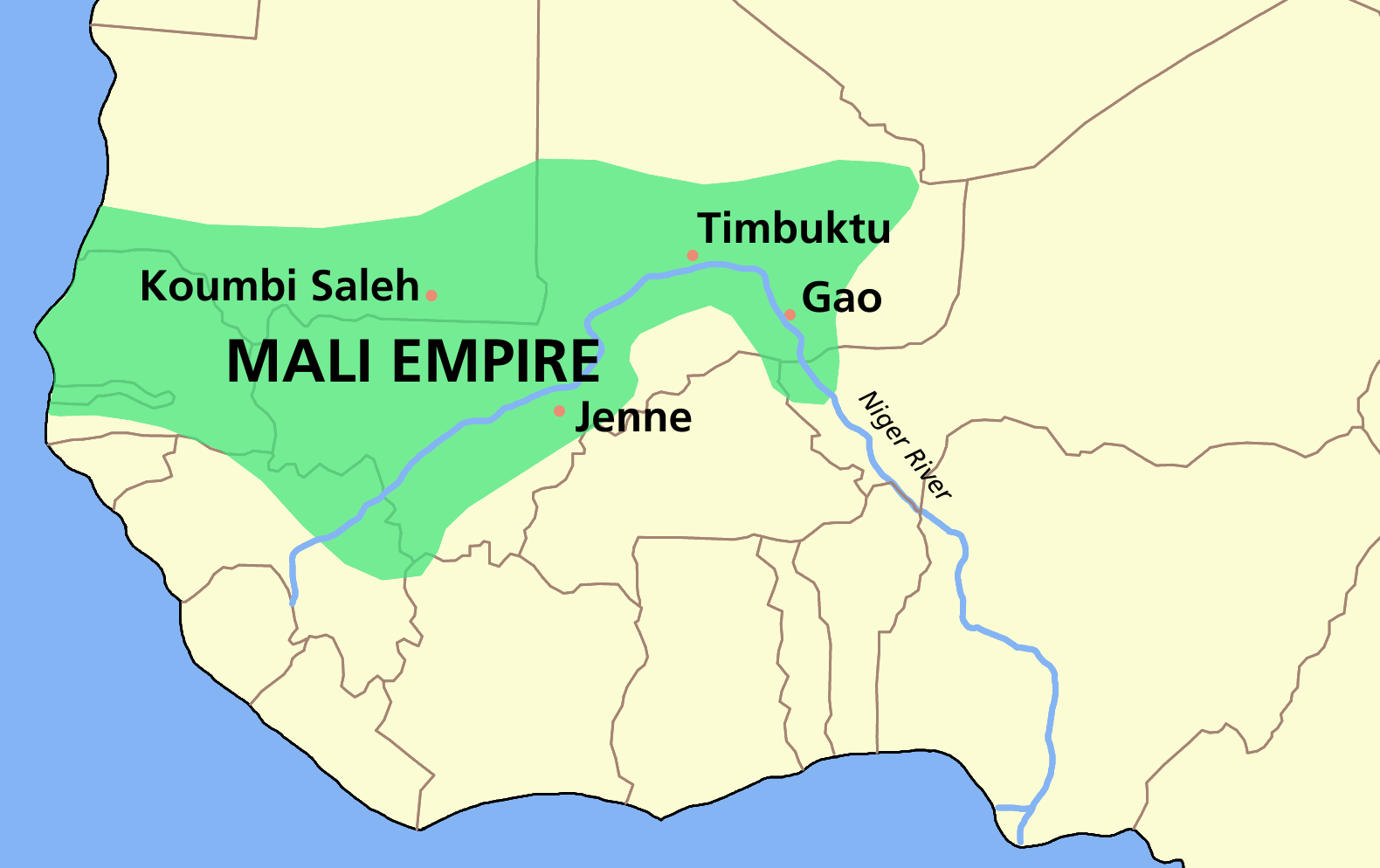
The territorial extent of the Mali Empire c. 1350

This part of the book examines the development of the Mali Empire, viewed by Gomez as an urban empire that went on to conquer neighbouring regions. Gomez "analyzes the relationship between central authority and provinces, emerging relationships with Islam, social transformations among the freeborn, caste groups and slaves, and new gender dynamics. He suggests that these elements became the backbone of 'a model of statecraft that was both hierarchical and evolving'".

Chapter 5, "The Meanings of Sunjata and the Dawn of Imperial Mali", focuses on Mali's legendary dynastic founder Sunjata. The chapter marks the entry of oral-derived sources into the study, relying to a significant extent on the oral-derived Epic of Sunjata.

Chapter 6, "Mansā Mūsā and Global Mali", focuses on Mansā Mūsā and his famous pilgrimage to Mecca, which generated an extensive body of primary sources commenting on Mali from outside that empire, not least by Ibn Khaldūn. Gomez positions this as the moment when Mali "went global".

Chapter 7, "Intrigue, Islam, and Ibn Baṭṭūṭa", contemplates the eyewitness account of Mali by Ibn Baṭṭūṭa, and in particular the workings of dynastic succession and elite legitimation within the Mande community of Mali. Gomez argues that both Islam and slavery became progressively more embedded in imperial Mali's culture and economy, facilitated by the introduction of cowrie currency.

=== Part III. Imperial Songhay ===
The territorial extent of the Songhai Empire c. 1500

Chapter 8, "Sunni ʿAlī and the Reinvention of Songhay", explores the rise of Songhay, and particularly the violence and terror of Sunni ʿAlī, its founder. It argues that key economic and political structures of the Mali Empire were perpetuated by Songhay, with Gao re-emerging as a political centre, yet that Sunni ʿAlī was "a regionalist who had little or no interest in the international links courted by the likes of Mansā Mūsā".

Chapter 9, "The Sunni and the Scholars: A Tale of Revenge", focuses on the Arabic-language West-African writing which constitutes the key source material for Songhay rests, and the Muslim holy men who created it. This chapter analysis of two of Gomez's key primary sources, the West-African chronicles Tārīkh al-Sūdān (c. 1652, by ʿAbd al-Raḥmān ibn ʿImrān al-Saʾdī) and Taʾrīkh al-fattāsh (c. 1519–1665, attributed to Maḥmūd Kaʾti), which focus on the rise and fall of imperial Songhay.

Chapter 10, "Renaissance: The Age of Askia al-Ḥājj Muḥammad", focuses on the Songhay Empire at its height. According to Amir Syed, Gomez argues that whereas Sunni ʿAlī "'would embark upon a strategy of attacking one community of scholars associated with his political nemesis, while embracing an alternative group of more neutral elites'", Askia al-Ḥājj Muḥammad was part of a "'renaissance' that reestablished the importance of urban centers, and 'reconnections with polities and luminaries in the central Islamic lands'". Gomez argues that during this period people began to identify ethnically with the Songhay state over other group identities".

Chapter 11, "Of Clerics and Concubines", revises previous readings of well known primary sources to emphasise the importance of holy men of Mori Koyra at the expense of Jenne and Timbuktu, a reading of the competing interests of religion, politics, and commerce that emphasises the power of the state and of spirituality at the expense of the learned clerisy. The chapter explores the concubinage practices of the elite and the role of the increasingly large number of eunuchs in imperial service.

=== Part IV. Le dernier de l'empire ===
Chapter 12, "Of Fitnas and Fratricide: The Nadir of Imperial Songhay" focuses on the twenty years of civil strife and chaos following the toppling of Askia al-Ḥājj Muḥammad's reign.

Chapter 13, "Surfeit and Stability: The Era of Askia Dāwūd", focuses on the last successful ruler of Songhay, Askia Dāwūd, who reigned for thirty-four years. In the summary of Amir Syed,

while this ruler brought a modicum of peace, Gomez also suggests that he significantly expanded domestic slavery (334). He argues that even though slavery was significant throughout West African history, it is only under Askia Dāwūd that Songhay became a 'slave society in every sense of the concept' (354). Here Gomez details the transfiguration of social relationship and power of slave holders over slaves. This intensification of slavery, however, also created space for servile groups close to ruling elites to gain and wield significant power (350–351).

Chapter 14, "The Rending Asunder: Dominion's End", concludes Gomez's chronological history with the Moroccan invasion of Songhay in 1591 and the associated internal divisions within Songhay. Gomez positions the collapse of the empire as the end of a millennium-long period of empire in West Africa.

The reviewer Ousmane Kane noted "the absence of a conclusion. [...] The fourteenth and last chapters of the book address the collapse of the Songhay Empire following the Saadian invasion. An unexpected epilogue of three pages or so starts with a discussion of the Malian crisis of 2012, without a clear indication of how this is connected to a history of empires ending with the collapse of the Songhay Empire".

== Reception ==
Surveying responses to the book, Hadrien Collet found that "il est possible d’observer deux tendances globalement parallèles quant à la réception du livre. D’un côté, le milieu des chercheurs spécialistes du Moyen Âge africain s’est montré assez sévère, d’un autre côté, la critique historienne états-unienne, africaniste ou plus généraliste, a salué un livre nécessaire et indispensable" ("it is possible to observe two generally parallel trends in the reception of the book. On the one hand, the community of researchers specializing in the African Middle Ages has been quite severe; on the other, American, Africanist, and more generalist historical criticism has praised a necessary and indispensable book"). Collet found the book unusual in presenting a grand narrative for a large region over a long period, despite the extremely patchy evidence, an approach which he thought perhaps inevitably led to overlooking some recent secondary literature and subtleties of source criticism; Georgi Asatryan even compared the book's approach to Edward Gibbon's The History of the Decline and Fall of the Roman Empire. Collet noted, however, that "le livre est exigeant, écrit dans un langage châtié, voire parfois abstrait" ("the book is demanding, written in sophisticated, sometimes indeed abstract, language").

A key criticism from specialists was what they viewed as Gomez's insufficiently rigorous source criticism, particularly regarding the Taʾrīkh al-fattāsh, and cursory use of epigraphic evidence, concerns which prompted the main part of Gomez's response to the American Historial Review coverage of the book.

Reviewers also noted the limitations of the book's scope. Adam Simmons observed that "perhaps inevitably for a book that forms only about 60 per cent of what Gomez intended to be a two-volume work (p. vii), the book does omit some significant material. While it does not claim to be an imperial history ‘of’ West Africa, readers should be aware that its focus largely excludes expansive and specialised discussion of the surrounding regions of the Middle Niger Valley—unless seen from the viewpoint of a Middle Niger polity". The scope of the study is political, with relatively little attention to religion as such or to art.

Ghislaine Lydon found Gomez's emphasis on women one of the work's most important historiographical contributions.

== Reviews not cited above ==
- Benjamin, Jody A. (2020). "African Dominion: A New History of Empire in Early and Medieval West Africa by Michael A. Gomez (review)". Journal of West African History. 6 (1): 142–146. ISSN 2327-1876.
- Salton, Herman T (2020). "African dominion: A new history of empire in early and medieval west Africa; African kings and black slaves: sovereignty and dispossession in the early modern Atlantic; Caravans of gold, fragments in time: art, culture, and exchange across medieval Saharan Africa". International Affairs. 96 (2): 549–551. doi:10.1093/ia/iiaa031. ISSN 0020-5850.
- Truden, John (2019). "Michael A. Gomez, African Dominion: a new history of empire in early and medieval West Africa. Princeton NJ: Princeton University Press (hb US$45/£35 – 978 0 691 17742 7). 2018, 513 pp". Africa. 89 (2): 420–421. doi:10.1017/S000197201900024X. ISSN 0001-9720.
