= William Y. Adams =

Anthropologist, archaeologist, Nubiologist (1927–2019)

- Born: William Yewdale Adams; 6 August 1927; Los Angeles, California, U.S.
- Died: 22 August 2019 (aged 92); Lexington, Kentucky, U.S.
- Occupations: Anthropologist and archaeologist

William Yewdale Adams (August 6, 1927 – August 22, 2019) was a professor of anthropology at the University of Kentucky. He was the winner of the 1978 Herskovits Prize for his history of Nubia, Nubia: Corridor to Africa. In 2005 Adams was awarded the Order of the Two Niles, Sudan's highest civilian honor, for his contributions to Nubian history.

== Early life ==
William Yewdale Adams was born in 1927 in Los Angeles, California, the second child of William Forbes Adams, an historian, and Lucy Mary née Wilcox Adams. His older brother was the philosopher Ernest Wilcox Adams. Following the death of his father in 1935, the family moved to Window Rock, Arizona where the widowed Lucy Adams took a position with the Bureau of Indian Affairs. These early years on the Navajo Reservation had a profoundly formative effect on the boy that led to a lifelong love of the American Southwest and an interest in other cultures.

== Work ==
Adams's work in Nubia began in 1959 as part of the UNESCO archaeological salvage campaign to excavate sites threatened by the rising flood waters of Lake Nasser following the construction of the Aswan Dam. Over the course of the next seven years he excavated a number of medieval sites in northern Sudan, including the pottery factories at Faras. By analyzing the changing proportions of broken potsherds in the fill, Adams was able to establish a typology of Nubian pottery that could be used to date excavation levels.

For his work, he awarded the Grand Officer title of the Order of the Two Niles in 2006.
