= John Thornton (historian) =

American historian (born 1949)

John K. Thornton
- Born: 3 May 1949 (age 77); Fort Monroe, Virginia, U.S.
- Occupations: Historian; professor
- Spouse: Linda Heywood
- Relatives: Betsy Thornton (sister)
- Awards: 2008 Herskovits Prize (with Linda Heywood)

Academic background
- Education: University of Michigan; University of California, Los Angeles

John K. Thornton (born 1949) is an American historian specializing in the history of Africa, the African Diaspora and the Atlantic World. He is a professor in the history department at Boston University.

== Biography ==
=== Early life and education ===
Thornton was born 3 May 1949 in Fort Monroe, Virginia. His father, Col. Robert L. Thornton, was then serving in the US Air Force, eventually becoming a professor of business administration at Miami University in Oxford, Ohio. His mother, Mary E. (Kelly) Thornton, a classicist, was also later a professor at Miami U. His sister is novelist Betsy Thornton. His daughter Amara Thornton is a historian of archaeology working in the United Kingdom. He was educated at the University of Michigan (1971) and UCLA (1972 and PhD 1979). He is married to fellow Africanist historian and collaborator Linda Heywood.

=== Career ===
Thornton held various history faculty positions in the United States and Africa during the 1980s including the University of Zambia, Allegheny College and the University of Virginia. He joined the faculty at Millersville University in 1986 and joined the Boston University faculty in fall 2003.

== Works ==
Thornton focused initially on the history of the Kingdom of Kongo. From the start of this work, Thornton became convinced that the status of Kongo as a Christian country had not been fully recognized through his work on missionary baptismal statistics which he sought to show reflected large scale baptism and used this material to write a treatise on Kongo demography. His work on baptismal records resulted in the publication of the article "Demography and History in the Kingdom of Kongo" (1977), and a contribution on another baptismal document in the First Edinburgh Conference on African Historical Demography (1978).

Thornton's thesis, published as The Kingdom of Kongo: Civil War and Transition, 1641–1718 (Madison, 1983) advanced the idea that Kongo's centralization was the result of a massive buildup of slave-worked plantations in the vicinity of its capital during the fifteenth through seventeenth centuries, and allowed kings to be overwhelmingly powerful. However, he argued, the persistent civil wars of the seventeenth century and the rise of a new population center in the coastal province of Soyo led to the depopulation of São Salvador and the loss of its centralization. In addition to this larger theme, Thornton also tried to integrate a history from below description of daily life and culture in the country by mining carefully the extensive documentation of the Capuchin missionaries in the country. In this work, he deliberately ignored using either earlier or later materials and much of the ethnographic materials so as to determine continuity and change in the kingdom. Thornton would return to this theme in writing the biography of Dona Beatriz Kimpa Vita in showing the daily life of Kongo in her times (1684–1706).

Thornton's second book, Africa and Africans in the Making of the Atlantic World, 1400–1650 (Cambridge University Press, 1992, the second edition in 1998 extended its framework to 1800) was an examination of the Atlantic portions of Africa and their involvement in the Atlantic slave trade, as well as the impact of Africans in the American countries to which they were carried. In this work, Thornton sought to demonstrate that Africans had been more active participants in the trade that was previously believed, arguing controversially that African economic strength and power were sufficient to force Europeans to deal with them on their own terms.

At the same time, he also argued that Africans were not stripped of their culture in the Middle Passage and retained most of it in the first generation of their captivity. He tried to show how African sensibilities continued to be dominant in the first generation of captives in art, music, and language. He also suggested that resistance in the form of revolts in particular had roots in African military systems, and this last point was pursued in detail in several studies of slave revolts and the Haitian Revolution.

His studies of Africa in the slave trade led him, at the urging of English historian Jeremy Black to write a systematic study of African wars and military culture in the period of the slave trade, which appeared in 1999 as Warfare in Atlantic Africa, 1500–1800 (University College of London, 1999).

In 2007 he and his longtime collaborator (and wife) Linda Heywood published Central Africans, Atlantic Creoles and the Foundation of the Americas, 1585–1660 (Cambridge University Press). This work demonstrated that thanks to English and Dutch privateering on Portuguese vessels, virtually all the first generation of slaves brought to the colonies of these two countries came from Central Africa. They then went on to argue that the long contact between this region and Europe, the conversion of many of the people to Christianity, and the adaptation of various European items of culture, they could be considered "Atlantic Creoles" a term popularized by historian Ira Berlin. Basing themselves of many local archives in the United States, Bermuda, Barbados, England and the Netherlands, they went on to suggest that the Christian background of many early slaves may account for their high manumission rate and their role in cultural foundations of the Americas.

Thornton's work on the African Diaspora had also been accompanied by a growing interest in the indigenous people of the Americas, and their interaction with Europeans. Inspired by this idea, Thornton turned a course he had been teaching since 1995 into a new book, A Cultural History of the Atlantic World, in 2012. This book was an attempt to rethink the heritage of the Americas, and particular North America as owing as much or more to the larger Atlantic World as to the extension of Europe. Thus it sought to have comprehensive coverage of Africa, both American continents and the Caribbean; while at the same time following up the cultural threads he had first explored in Africa and Africans in the Making of the Atlantic World. The book was awarded the World History Association's annual prize for 2012.

== Honors and awards ==
He shared the 2008 Herskovits Prize for his book (co-authored with Linda Heywood) Central Africans, Atlantic Creoles, and the Foundation of the Americas, 1585–1660. In 2012, he was awarded the World History Association's annual prize for the best book in world history. He was elected to the American Academy of Arts and Sciences in 2020

== Selected bibliography ==
=== Books ===
- The Kingdom of Kongo: Civil War and Transition, 1641–1718 (Madison: University of Wisconsin Press, 1983).
- Africa and Africans in the Formation of the Atlantic World, 1400–1680 (New York and London: Cambridge University Press, 1992, second expanded edition, 1998). Portuguese translation: África e Africanos na Formação do Mundo Atlântico, 1400–1800 (Rio de Janeiro: Estampa, 2004); Italian translation, L’Africa e gli africani nella formazione del mondo atlantico, 1400–1800 (Bologna: Mulino, 2010).
- The Kongolese Saint Anthony: Dona Beatriz Kimpa Vita and the Antonian Movement, 1684–1706 (Cambridge: Cambridge University Press, 1998)
- Warfare in Atlantic Africa, 1500–1800 (University College of London Press/Routledge, 1999)
- (with Linda Heywood), Central Africans, Atlantic Creoles and the Foundation of the Americas, 1585–1660 (Cambridge: Cambridge University Press, 2007)
- (ed. and trans.) Evangelical Missions to the Kingdom of Kongo by Giovanni Antonio Cavazzi da Montecuccolo, 1665. Translation published on internet, presently at http://www.bu.edu/afam/faculty/john-thornton/john-thorntons-african-texts/.
- A Cultural History of the Atlantic World, 1250–1820. (Cambridge: Cambridge University Press, 2012).
- Giovanni Cavazzi da Montecuccolo (editor and notes: Xavier de Castro; foreword : John Thornton and Linda Heywood) (2014). Njinga, reine d'Angola (1582-1663). La relation d' Antonio Cavazzi de Montecuccolo (in French). Translated by Alix du Cheyron d’Abzac and Xavier de Castro. Paris: Chandeigne, collection : Magellane (published 2010). ISBN 978-2-36732-087-8.
- Dionigi Carli; Michelangelo Guattini (2006). La mission au Kongo des pères Michelangelo Guattini et Dionigi de' Carli (1668) (in French). Translated by Alix du Cheyron d’Abzac (foreword : John Thornton). Paris: Chandeigne, collection : Magellane. ISBN 978-2-915540-08-6.
