= Simon Gikandi =

Kenyan academic (born 1960)

- Born: 30 September 1960 (age 65); Nyeri, Kenya
- Education: University of Nairobi; University of Edinburgh
- Occupations: Professor and scholar

Simon E. Gikandi (born 30 September 1960) is a Kenyan Literature Professor and Postcolonial scholar. He is the Class of 1943 University Professor of English and Chair, Department of English at Princeton University. He is perhaps best known for his co-editorship (with Abiola Irele) of The Cambridge History of African and Caribbean Literature. He has also done important work on the modern African novel, and two distinguished African novelists: Chinua Achebe and Ngũgĩ wa Thiong'o. In 2019 he became the president of the Modern Language Association.

== Early life and education ==
Gikandi was born to a Presbyterian family in Nyeri, Kenya. He graduated with a B.A [First-Class Honors] in Literature from the University of Nairobi. He was a British Council Scholar at the University of Edinburgh in Scotland from which he graduated with a M.Litt. in English Studies. He has a Ph.D. in English from Northwestern University. His major fields of research and teaching are Anglophone Literatures and Cultures of Africa, India, the Caribbean, and Postcolonial Britain, the "Black" Atlantic and the African Diaspora. He is also interested in the encounter between European and African languages in the modern period, literature and human rights, and writing and cultural politics.

== Career ==
Gikandi is the author of many articles and books, including Writing in Limbo: Modernism and Caribbean Literature, Maps of Englishness: Writing Identity in the Culture of Colonialism (Cornell University Press, 1992), and Ngugi wa Thiong'o (Cambridge University Press, 2009), which was a Choice Outstanding Academic Publication for 2004, and is co-author of The Columbia Guide to East African Literature in English Since 1945 (Columbia University Press, 2007). His article, "Picasso, Africa, and the Schemata of Difference" (2003) recalls the mid-1950s meeting between Pablo Picasso and Aubrey Williams, "a leading member of Afro-modernism and black abstractionism".

Gikandi is the co-editor of The Cambridge History of African and Caribbean Literature (Cambridge University Press, 2004) and the editor of the Routledge Encyclopedia of African Literature (Routledge, 2003). His latest book is Slavery and the Culture of Taste (Princeton University Press, 2011). This text was widely acclaimed, earning many academic awards. He is currently editing Vol. 11 of The Oxford History of the Novel in English: The Novel in Africa and the Atlantic World.

From 1991 until 2004, Gikandi taught at the University of Michigan-Ann Arbor, as a faculty member in the Comparative Literature department. He began teaching at Princeton in 2004, as a faculty member in the English department. Gikandi has also held positions at University of Massachusetts-Boston (1987–91), Harvard University (1989–90), and California State University- Bakersfield (1986–87).

== Awards and honors ==
Gikandi is the recipient of numerous awards and honors, including:

- American Council of Learned Societies fellowship (1989)
- Guggenheim fellowship (2001)
- Slavery and the Culture of Taste (2011)
  - Winner, 14th Annual (2012) Susanne M. Glasscock Humanities Book Prize for Interdisciplinary Scholarship, Melbern G. Glasscock Center for Humanities Research at Texas A&M University
  - Co-winner, 2011 James Russell Lowell Prize, Modern Language Association
  - Co-winner, 2012 Herskovits Prize, African Studies Association
  - Choice's Outstanding Academic Titles for 2012
- President’s Award for Distinguished Teaching, Princeton University (2014)
- Howard T. Behrman Award for Distinguished Achievement in the Humanities, Princeton University (2017)
- Fellow, American Academy of Arts and Sciences (2018)
- Fellow of the British Academy (2022)

== Selected bibliography ==
- Reading the African Novel (Portsmouth, NH: Heinemann, 1987).
- Reading Chinua Achebe (Portsmouth, NH: Heinemann, 1991).
- Writing in Limbo: Modernism and Caribbean Literature (Ithaca: Cornell University Press, 1992).
- Maps of Englishness: Writing Identity in the Culture of Colonialism (New York: Columbia University Press, 1996).
- Ngugi wa Thiongʹo (Cambridge Studies in African and Caribbean Literature) (Cambridge: Cambridge University Press, 2000).
- Slavery and the Culture of Taste (Princeton: Princeton University Press, 2011).
