= John Iliffe (historian) =

British historian (1939–2026)

- Born: 1 May 1939; Luton, Bedfordshire, England
- Died: 20 August 2026 (aged 87); Cambridge, England
- Education: Peterhouse, Cambridge
- Known for: Historian of Africa
- Notable work: The African Poor: A History
- Awards: Herskovits Prize (1988)

John Iliffe (1 May 1939 – 20 August 2026) was a British historian, who specialised in the history of Africa and especially of Tanzania.

== Life and career ==
Iliffe was born in Luton, Bedfordshire, on 1 May 1939. He was educated at Framlingham College and Peterhouse, Cambridge, where he completed his BA and PhD. After teaching at the University of Dar es Salaam for several years he was appointed Assistant Director of Research in History at the University of Cambridge and a fellow of St John's College. In 1980 he became a Reader in African History at Cambridge, and 10 years later was made Professor of African History, remaining in place until his retirement in 2006. He was awarded the 1988 Herskovits Prize for The African Poor: A History.

He was a fellow of the British Academy from 1989 to 2006. Iliffe died in Cambridge, England, on 20 August 2026, aged 87.

== Notable works ==
- Tanganyika Under German Rule, 1905-1912 (1969)
- Modern Tanzanians (editor, 1973)
- A Modern History of Tanganyika (1979)
- The Emergence of African Capitalism (1983)
- The African Poor: A History (1987)
- Famine in Zimbabwe, 1890–1960 (1990)
- Africans: The History of a Continent (1995; 2nd ed. 2007; 3rd ed. 2017)
- East African Doctors: A History of the Modern Profession (1998)
- Honour in African History (2005)
- The African AIDS Epidemic: A History (2006)
- Obasanjo, Nigeria and the World (2011)
