= Betsy Thornton =

American novelist

- Born: Wilmington, North Carolina, U.S.
- Education: Ohio Wesleyan University
- Occupation: Writer
- Parent(s): Robert L. Thornton; Mary Elizabeth Kelly
- Relatives: John Thornton (brother)
- Writing career
- Genre: Mystery fiction
- Website: betsythornton.com

Betsy Thornton is a contemporary American writer of mystery fiction novels set in the Southwestern United States.

== Biography ==
Thornton was born in Wilmington, North Carolina, United States, the oldest of four children born to Dr. Mary Elizabeth (Kelly) Thornton, PhD a professor of Classics at Miami University of Ohio and Colonel Robert L. Thornton, PhD, who became professor of Business at Miami of Ohio following his retirement from the USAF. Her sister Alix was an attorney and her brother is historian John Thornton. Her family traveled extensively, living in Europe for several years, where Thornton attended Lady Eden's School in London and Cours Ste. Geneviève in Fonteney sur Bois, a suburb of Paris. She graduated from Ohio Wesleyan University with a degree in English, married, and lived in New York City, where her son Alex Chapin, now an academic technologist at the University of North Carolina at Charlotte, was born. She later moved to Venice, California, where she worked as a story analyst for ABC Pictures, and then moved to Europe with her second husband, the artist Rafe Ropek. They lived in Rome and on a small Greek island, Skopelos.

Eventually, after a stint back in New York City, Thornton moved to Bisbee, Arizona, where she ran Cochise Fine Arts, a community arts center that sponsored, among other things, the Bisbee Poetry Festival.

Thornton was employed for fifteen years with the Cochise County Attorney's office in Cochise County, Arizona, where she worked as an advocate for crime victims.

Thornton's first published work was a chapbook of poems, published by Binturong, On Davis Road. In 1982, she was awarded a Poetry Fellowship by the Arizona Commission on the Arts.

== Mystery fiction ==
Thornton has authored eight mystery novels, all but one of which feature her main character, Chloe Newcomb. Newcomb works as a victim advocate, the same position that Thornton herself held.

In 2008, Thornton's sixth novel, A Song for You, was nominated for the Mary Higgins Clark Award. Her works have been favorably reviewed in Publishers Weekly, The New York Times, and The Washington Post. They are published in hard covers by St. Martin's Press as well as in paperback. A Whole New Life was published in Reader's Digest Condensed Books.

Thornton's latest work Empty Houses was issued by Severn House in the UK on March 31, 2015, and in the United States in July.

== Published works ==
- The Cowboy Rides Away (1996)
- High Lonesome Road (2001)
- Ghost Towns (2002)
- Dead for the Winter (2004)
- A Whole New Life (2006) Also in Hungarian
- A Song for You (2008)
- Dream Queen (2010)
- Empty Houses (Severn House, 2015)
