= Michael A. Gomez =

American academic (born 1955)

- Title: Silver Professor at New York University

Academic background
- Education: Amherst College; University of Chicago (BA, MA, PhD)

Academic work
- Discipline: Historian
- Sub-discipline: West Africa, the African diaspora, Islam, Slavery
- Institutions: Washington University in St. Louis; Spelman College; University of Georgia; New York University

Michael A. Gomez (born 1955) is an American academic, historian, and author. He is the Silver Professor at New York University, noted for his work on West Africa, the African diaspora, Islam, and slavery.

== Education ==
Gomez began a BA degree at Amherst College, transferring to the University of Chicago, where he took all his subsequent degrees: a BA in US History (1981), an MA degree in African history (1982) and a PhD in African history (1985).

== Career ==
Gomez proceeded from his PhD to a position as assistant professor in the Department of History/African and Afro-American Studies in Arts and Sciences at Washington University in St. Louis (1985–88). In 1988 he moved to the Department of History at Spelman College, where he was Assistant Professor from 1988–92 and Associate Professor 1992–97. From 1997 to 1999 he was a Professor in the Department of History/African American Studies at the Franklin College of Arts and Sciences at the University of Georgia, proceeding to the role of Professor in the Departments of History and Middle Eastern and Islamic Studies at New York University, a position he still held as of 2024. He founded the Association for the Study of the Worldwide African Diaspora and was its director from 2000 to 2007. From 2017 he was also Silver Professor at New York University, taking up the position of director of the university's Center for the Study of Africa and the African Diaspora in 2018.

Gomez's 2005 book Black Crescent was awarded the 2006 Black Caucus of the American Library Association Award in the non-fiction category, while his 2018 book African Dominion won the 2019 African Studies Association Book Prize and the 2019 American Historical Association Martin A. Klein Prize in African History.

== List of publications ==
Gomez's single-author monographs are:

- African Dominion: A New History of Empire in Early and Medieval West Africa (Princeton: Princeton University Press, 2018)
- Reversing Sail: A History of the African Diaspora (Cambridge: Cambridge University Press, 2005) [2nd edn 2019]
- Black Crescent: African Muslims in the Americas (Cambridge: Cambridge University Press, 2005)
- Exchanging Our Country Marks: The Transformation of African Identities in the Colonial and Antebellum South (University of North Carolina Press, 1998)
- Pragmatism in the Age of Jihad: The Precolonial State of Bundu (Cambridge: Cambridge University Press, 1992)
