= Carola Lentz =

German ethnologist

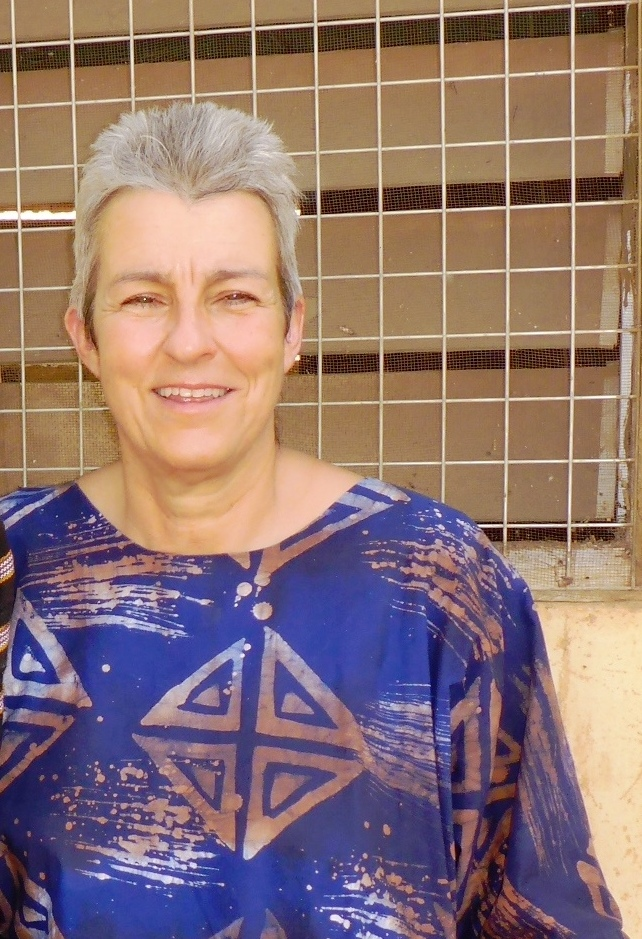
- Carola Lentz, 2016, in Hamile, Ghana
- Born: April 21, 1954 (age 72); Braunschweig, Germany

Academic background
- Education: University of Göttingen (first state exam); University of Hamburg (second state exam); University of Göttingen (Master of Science); Leibniz University Hannover (PhD)

Academic work
- Institutions: Free University of Berlin; Northwestern University, Illinois; Goethe University, Frankfurt; Netherlands Institute for Advanced Study; University of Mainz; Max Planck Institute for Social Anthropology, Halle; Harvard University, Cambridge
- Main interests: ethnicity, nationalism, politics of memory, land rights, land disputes, colonial history, anthropology of the state, middle class, and anthropological theories of culture

Carola Lentz (*April 21, 1954, in Braunschweig) is a German social anthropologist and, since November 2020, president of the Goethe-Institut. She is senior research professor at the Department of Anthropology and African Studies at Johannes Gutenberg University, Mainz.

== Biography ==
From 1972 to 1979 Lentz studied sociology, political science, German studies, and education at University of Göttingen and Free University of Berlin. After passing her first state exam in secondary school education at University of Göttingen in 1979, she there continued her studies in sociology while also working as a teacher at "Arbeit und Leben" ('work and life') (an association supported by the German trade union federation) in Göttingen and Braunschweig. Following two years of teacher training in Hamburg from 1981 until 1982, she sat the second state exam, completing her qualification to work as a secondary school teacher. See also:

She continued her education at the University of Göttingen, undertaking her postgraduate studies in agricultural sciences in the tropics and subtropics at the 'Department of Rural Development' (now called 'Department of Agricultural Economics and Rural Development'), with social anthropology and agricultural sociology as her subsidiary subjects. In 1985, she completed her Master of Science in Tropical and Subtropical Agriculture; two years later, Lentz received her PhD in sociology from the University of Hannover. See also: In the years that followed, she worked as research assistant of the regional group 'Africa and Europe' at the Institute of Anthropology, Free University of Berlin. Between 1992 and 1995, Lentz conducted her habilitation research, supported by a scholarship by the German Research Foundation. In May 1993, she held a fellowship at the Institute for Advanced Study and Research in the African Humanities, Northwestern University (Illinois, USA). In 1995–96, Lentz deputized for a chair of social anthropology at the Department of Historical Ethnology at Goethe University, Frankfurt. After completing her habilitation at the Free University of Berlin in October 1996, she worked as university professor for social anthropology with a focus on the social anthropology of Africa at Goethe University Frankfurt/Main, a position she held until 2002. In 2000–01, Lentz was a fellow at the Netherlands Institute for Advanced Study in the Humanities and Social Sciences, Wassenaar. During her time at the University of Frankfurt, she participated in the SFB special research unit 268 'West-African savannah' working in particular to promote and organize academic exchange with the partner university in Ouagadougou, Burkina Faso.

From April 2002 to September 2019, Lentz was professor for social anthropology at the Department of Anthropology and African Studies at Johannes Gutenberg University, Mainz. During that time, she was awarded various fellowships, amongst others at the Max Planck Institute for Social Anthropology in Halle (October – December 2002) and at the W.E.B. Du Bois Institute for African and African American Research at Harvard University, Cambridge, financed by a Fulbright scholarship (2008–09). From 2011 until 2015, she was president of the Berliner Gesellschaft für Anthropologie, Ethnologie und Urgeschichte. Between October 2012 and July 2013, she was fellow at the international research centre 'Work and Human Life Cycle in Global History' at Humboldt University, Berlin. In 2014, she was elected member of the Berlin-Brandenburg Academy of Sciences and Humanities (BBAW), serving as secretary of the BBAW's Social Science Class (2016–18). In autumn 2014, she was the first German researcher to be awarded the Melville J. Herskovits Prize, the most important international book prize in African studies, for her book Land, Mobility and Belonging in West Africa, a project on which she worked for more than fifteen years. From April to July 2015, she held a fellowship at the Institute for Advanced Study (de:Hanse-Wissenschaftskolleg) in Delmenhorst. From September 2017 to July 2018, she was a fellow at the Berlin Institute for Advanced Study (Wissenschaftskolleg zu Berlin), leading the focus group 'Family History and Social Change in Africa'. From 2018 to 2020, she was vice-president of the Berlin-Brandenburg Academy of Sciences and Humanities. In spring 2019, she held a two-month fellowship at the Stellenbosch Institute for Advanced Study, participating in a research group on the new middle class in Africa. Since October 2019, she has held the position of senior research professor at the Department of Anthropology and African Studies at Johannes Gutenberg University, Mainz.

On November 13, 2020, Lentz became president of the Goethe-Institut, following her predecessor Klaus-Dieter Lehmann. In autumn 2020, she has been elected member of the German National Academy of Sciences Leopoldina.

== Research focus ==
Thematically, Lentz' research focuses on ethnicity, nationalism, the politics of memory, land rights, land disputes, colonial history, the anthropology of the state, elite biographies, the emergence of African middle class, qualitative research methods and anthropological theories of culture. Her regional focus is West Africa, in particular Ghana and Burkina Faso. After conducting fieldwork in Bolivia and Ecuador (1980), and again in Ecuador on Indian labour migration and changing indigenous identities (1983–1985), Lentz began her research in West Africa. Between 1987 and 1996, she regularly conducted fieldwork in North-Western Ghana (altogether eighteen months) on topics such as ethnicity, the emergence of elite(s) and middle class, labour migration (gold mines), colonial history, and the history of chieftaincy. In December 1996, she monitored the parliamentary and presidential elections in Ghana as a member of an election observer team sent by the Federal Foreign Office. Lentz also has a special interest in Burkina Faso. Between 1997 and 2005, she regularly conducted fieldwork in Southern Burkina Faso, exploring topics including settlement history, land rights, ethnicity and the politics of belonging with the aim to do comparative research with North-Western Ghana. From 2005 onward, Lentz conducted further fieldwork in Ghana in the context of the research project 'States at Work', funded by Volkswagen Foundation. In 2006, she supervised the fieldwork of a group of Master's students on work at police stations, courts and schools in Upper West Region, Ghana. In that context she also conducted her own research on the history and the contemporary situation of educational elite(s) and the newly emerging middle class in Northern Ghana. Between 2009 and 2013, Lentz coordinated a doctoral research group that explored the politics of memory and national-day celebrations in Africa as part of the programme 'PRO Geistes- und Sozialwissenschaften 2015' at Johannes Gutenberg University, Mainz. In addition, Lentz supervised the fieldwork of a group of Master's students on African national-day celebrations, initiated in 2010. Between 2013 and 2019, she continued research on the politics of memory, national-day celebrations, nation-building and the performance of the nation and subnational differences in Africa in the context of a follow-up project that was part of the research unit Un/Doing Differences, funded by the German Research Foundation.

Moreover, Lentz has served as editor and reviewer. She was a member of the academic advisory councils of, among others, the journals Food and Foodways, Africa, Ethnos, African Affairs, Africa Spectrum, de:Paideuma, and de:Zeitschrift für Ethnologie. She was co-editor of the series Mainzer Beiträge zur Afrikaforschung. as well as of the series African Social Studies issued by Brill, Leiden. She was also a member of the board of trustees of the Heckmann Wentzel Foundation and a member of the academic advisory council of the Einstein Chronoi Center. In 2020, Lentz has been elected member of the German National Academy of Sciences Leopoldina, serving as expert in the section cultural sciences. As president of the Goethe-Institut, she currently holds membership in several partner organisations. She is, for example, member of the advisory committee of the German Federal Cultural Foundation, permanent guest of the DAAD's executive committee and member of the board of trustees of the foundation Stiftung Lesen (i. e. the 'Reading Foundation').

== Selected works ==
=== Monographs (selection) ===
- 2022. Imagining Futures: Memory and Belonging in an African Family (with Isidore Lobnibe). Bloomington: Indiana University Press
- 2021. Das Goethe-Institut. Eine Geschichte von 1951 bis heute (with Marie-Christin Gabriel). Stuttgart: Klett-Cotta, ISBN 978-3-608-11700-4
- 2018. Remembering Independence (with David Lowe). London: Routledge, ISBN 978-1138905726
- 2013. Land, Mobility and Belonging in West Africa. Bloomington: Indiana University Press, ISBN 978-0-253-00957-9
- 2006. Ethnicity and the Making of History in Northern Ghana. Edinburgh: Edinburgh University Press (International African Library 33), ISBN 0-7486-2401-5
- 1998. Die Konstruktion von Ethnizität. Eine politische Geschichte Nord-West Ghanas, 1870–1990. Köln: Köppe (Studien zur Kulturkunde 112), ISBN 3-89645-207-X
- 1988. 'Von seiner Heimat kann man nicht lassen'. Migration in einer Dorfgemeinde in Ecuador. Frankfurt a. M.: Campus, ISBN 3-593-34019-4 (revised vision of the doctoral thesis submitted in 1987 at University of Hannover; Spanish translation 1997: Migración e identidad étnica. La transformación histórica de una comunidad indígena en la Sierra ecuatoriana. Quito: Abya Yala, ISBN 9978-04-198-2).
- 1986. Saisonarbeiter auf einer Zuckerrohrplantage in Ecuador. 'Buscando la vida...'. Auf der Suche nach dem Leben. Aachen: Edition Herodot, ISBN 3-922868-76-2 (Spanish translation 1991: 'Buscando la vida'. Trabajadores eventuales en una plantación de azúcar. Quito: Abya Yala).
- 1985. Migrantes. Campesinos de Flores y Licto. Historias de vida (with Hernán Carrasco). Quito: Abya Yala.

=== Edited books (selection) ===
- 2013. Thomas Bierschenk, Matthias Krings and Carola Lentz (eds.): Ethnologie im 21. Jahrhundert. Berlin: Reimer, ISBN 978-3496028635
- 2011. Carola Lentz and Godwin Kornes (eds.): Staatsinszenierung, Erinnerungsmarathon und Volksfest. Afrika feiert 50 Jahre Unabhängigkeit. Frankfurt a. M.: Brandes & Apsel, ISBN 978-3-86099-717-8
- 2009. Carola Lenz (ed.): Gandah-Yir: The House of the Brave. The Biography of a Northern Ghanaian Chief (ca. 1872–1950), by S.W.D.K. Gandah (Research Review Supplement 20). Legon: Institute of African Studies, University of Ghana, ISBN 978-9988-1-2466-3
- 2008. Carola Lentz (ed.): The Silent Rebel: The Missing Years. Life in the Tamale Middle School (1940–47), by S.W.D.K. Gandah (Research Review Supplement 18). Legon: Institute of African Studies, University of Ghana, ISSN 0855-4412
- 2006. Anna-Maria Brandstetter and Carola Lentz (eds.): 60 Jahre Institut für Ethnologie und Afrikastudien. Ein Geburtstagsbuch (Mainzer Beiträge zur Afrikaforschung 14). Köln: Köppe, ISBN 3-89645-814-0
- 2006. Richard Kuba and Carola Lentz (eds.): Land and the Politics of Belonging in West Africa (African Social Studies Series 9). Leiden: Brill, ISBN 90-04-14817-5
- 2003. Richard Kuba, Carola Lentz and Claude Nurukyor Somda (eds.): Histoire du peuplement et relations interethniques au Burkina Faso. Paris: Karthala, ISBN 2-84586-459-0
- 2001. Richard Kuba, Carola Lentz and Katja Werthmann (eds.): Les Dagara et leurs voisins. Histoire de peuplement et relations interethniques au sud-ouest du Burkina Faso. Frankfurt a. M.: SFB 268, ISBN 3-9806129-4-5
- 2000. Carola Lentz and Paul Nugent (eds.): Ethnicity in Ghana. The Limits of Invention. Basingstoke: Macmillan, ISBN 0-333-73323-1
- 1999. Carola Lentz (ed.): Changing Food Habits. Case Studies from Africa, South America and Europe (Food in History and Culture 2). Amsterdam: Harwood Academic Publishers, ISBN 90-5702-564-7

=== Articles (selection) ===
- with Andrea Noll: "Across regional disparities and beyond family ties: a Ghanaian middle class in the making (with Andrea Noll)". History and Anthropology, 2021
- with Marie-Christin Gabriel and Konstanze N'Guessan: "Embodying the nation: the production of sameness and difference in national-day parades", Ethnography, 21(4): 506–536 (2020)
- "Doing being middle-class in the global South: comparative perspectives and conceptual challenges". Africa, 90 (3): 439–69.2018
- "Culture: the making, unmaking and remaking of an anthropological concept". Zeitschrift für Ethnologie, 142 (2), 2017: 181–204 (2017)
- "Ghanaian 'monument wars': the contested history of the Nkrumah statues". Cahiers d'Etudes Africaines, 227: 551–82 (2017)
- "Tribalism' and ethnicity in Africa: a review of four decades of Anglophone research". Cahiers des Sciences Humaines, 31: 303–28. (1995)
- "Home, death and leadership: discourses of an educated elite from northwestern Ghana". Social Anthropology, 2: 149–69 (1994)
- "Feldforschung als Interaktionsprozeß – Erfahrungen in indianischen Dörfern in Ecuador". Sociologus, 39: 123–51. (1989)
- "Zwischen 'Zivilisation' und 'eigener Kultur'. Neue Funktionen ethnischer Identität bei indianischen Arbeitsmigranten in Ecuador". Zeitschrift für Soziologie, 17: 34–46. (1988)

== Awards ==
- Fellow Netherlands Inst. f. Adv. Stud. in the Humanities 2000–2001
- Fulbright Fellow/ W.E.B. Du Bois Inst. for African and African American Res., Harvard University. (Cambridge, USA) 2008–2009
- Fellow humanities College "Work and Life Course in Global Historical Perspective" HU Berlin 2012–2013
- Fellow de:Hanse-Wissenschaftskolleg, 2015
- Fellow Berlin Institute for Advanced Study 2017–2018
- Fellow Stellenbosch Inst. for Advanced Study 2019
- Melville J. Herskovits Award of African Studies Association (ASA) 2013
- Member. Berlin-Brandenburg Academy of Sciences and Humanities (BBAW) 2014
- Secretary of social science Class BBAW 2016–2018
- Title of an Honorary Chief (Maalu Naa) in the traditional region of Nandom Ghana (2013).
