= Worldmaking After Empire =

2019 non-fiction book by Adom Getachew

- Author: Adom Getachew
- Publisher: Princeton University Press
- Publication date: February 5, 2019
- Awards: ASA Best Book Prize (2020); J. David Greenstone Book Prize (2020)
- ISBN: 978-0-691-17915-5

Worldmaking After Empire: The Rise and Fall of Self-Determination is a 2019 non-fiction book about decolonization by Adom Getachew.

== Reception ==
=== Reviews ===
Worldmaking After Empire has been reviewed in various academic journals, including Capital & Class, Constellations, Contemporary Political Theory, Ethics & International Affairs, History, The Journal of Development Studies, New West Indian Guide, Perspectives on Politics, and the Singapore Journal of Tropical Geography,

=== Awards and honors ===
In 2020, Foreign Affairs named Worldmaking after Empire one of the best books of the year.

Awards for Worldmaking after Empire
Year	Organization	Award	Result	Ref.
2020	African Studies Association	ASA Best Book Prize	Winner	
2020	American Political Science Association, Foundations of Political Theory Section	First Book Award	Winner	
2020	American Political Science Association, Politics & History Section	J. David Greenstone Book Prize	Winner (tie)	
2020	International Studies Association, Theory Section	ISA Theory Best Book	Winner	
2020	National Conference of Black Political Scientists	W.E.B. Du Bois Distinguished Book Award	Winner (tie)	
2021	Caribbean Philosophical Association	Frantz Fanon Prize	Winner	
