= Gavin Kitching =

British author and social sciences professor

Gavin Kitching is a British author and professor of social sciences and international relations (formerly head of School Politics and International Relations) at the University of New South Wales, where he has taught since 1991. In 2007 Kitching became a fellow of the Academy of the Social Sciences in Australia.

== Academic and fiction work ==
Kitching is an expert on the philosophy of Ludwig Wittgenstein, and has made contributions to the philosophy behind Marxism. Earlier in his career, Kitching contributed to development studies, with the early best-selling course text Development and Underdevelopment (1989). His first research and published work focussed on development in Africa, particularly Tanzania and Kenya, for which he won the Herskovitz Prize. Since the early 1990s he moved to analysing post-soviet Russia during the process of de-collectivisation of land. Subsequently, he wrote about the effects of globalisation on social justice in the twenty-first-century economy, and is familiar to UNSW international studies students for teaching the introductory globalisation course.

Kitching is also a published novelist and playwright. The main characters play out their roles in the North-East of England, and the novels are whodunit crime stories.

== List of publications ==
Academic titles

- Capitalism and Democracy in the 21st Century: A Global Future Beyond Nationalism (2020) Routledge, ISBN 978-0-367-35491-6
- The trouble with theory: the educational costs of postmodernism (2008) Allen & Unwin, ISBN 978-1-74175-522-0
- Wittgenstein and Society: Essays in Conceptual Puzzlement (2003) Ashgate, ISBN 0-7546-3342-X
- Seeking Social Justice through Globalisation: Escaping a Nationalist Perspective (2001) Penn State Press, ISBN 0-271-02162-4
- Marxism and Science: Analysis of an Obsession (1994) Penn State Press, ISBN 0-271-01026-6
- Rethinking Socialism (1983) Meuthen, ISBN 0-416-35840-3
- Development and Underdevelopment in Historical Perspective (1989) 2nd Ed. Routledge, ISBN 0-415-03449-3
- Class and economic change in Kenya (1980) Yale University Press, ISBN 0-300-02385-5

Academic articles

- “The modernisation myth” (2006)
- “The concept of 'sebestoimost' in Russian farm accounting: A very unmagical mystery tour” (2001) 1 Journal of Agrarian Change 57
- “Why I gave up African Studies” (2000)

Fiction work

- The Death of a Politician (2007) online
- The Truth of the Matter (2007) online
- Sons and Smugglers (2007) online
- An Impossible Honesty: Scenes from the life of Ludwig Wittgenstein (2003) online, freely downloadable
- Karl Marx in Hell (2002) online, freely downloadable
- A Dream of Gazza (2001) online, freely downloadable
