= Residual Governance =

2023 book by Gabrielle Hecht

Residual Governance: How South Africa Foretells Planetary Futures
- Cover
- Author: Gabrielle Hecht
- Language: English
- Subject: Environmental history, mining in South Africa, racial capitalism, Anthropocene
- Genre: Non-fiction
- Publisher: Duke University Press
- Publication date: November 10, 2023
- Publication place: United States
- Pages: 288
- ISBN: 978-1-4780-2494-1
- Website: library.oapen.org/handle/20.500.12657/85660

Residual Governance: How South Africa Foretells Planetary Futures is a 2023 book by historian and anthropologist Gabrielle Hecht that traces the environmental and social impacts of gold and uranium mining in South Africa's Witwatersrand region. The book introduces the concept of "residual governance"—defined as the governance of waste and discards, minimalist governance using simplification and delay, and governance that treats people and places as waste—arguing that this framework represents a primary instrument of racial capitalism and a major driver of environmental destruction in the Anthropocene. Based on two decades of fieldwork and archival research, Hecht documents how mining waste continues to affect millions of South Africans despite the end of apartheid in 1994, concentrating on acid mine drainage, radioactive dust, and the experiences of communities living near mine dumps. The work centers the perspectives of activists, scientists, and affected residents rather than state and corporate actors, incorporating 87 illustrations as primary sources. The book was published by Duke University Press as an open-access monograph, and it received the 2024 PROSE Award in Government and Politics, Association of American Publishers, the 2024 PROSE Award for Excellence in Social Science, the E. Ohnuki Tierney Award for Historical Anthropology, and the African Studies Association's Best Book Award. It was a finalist for the Fleck prize from the Social Studies of Science, and received a third place Victor Turner Award for excellence in ethnographic writing.

The book was translated into Spanish by Jaime Landinez Aceros and published in open access by Qillqa under the title Gobernanza residual: Como Sudáfrica presagia futuros planetarios.

== Background ==
In a 2024 interview with JoburgTodayTV, Hecht explained that the book investigates how Johannesburg's long history of mining has affected the city and its inhabitants, focusing on what she calls "the after lives of mining." She noted that over 50 kilometers of mine waste bisect the city, combining with what she termed "more metaphorical waste" from apartheid and racism to shape not only Johannesburg's layout but also "the air that people breathe, the dust that they inhale, the water that they drink." Hecht emphasized that even mines closed decades ago continue to have violent effects on people's lives and health. Hecht emphasized that achieving environmental and infrastructural justice requires holding both mining companies and the state accountable, all while acknowledging that the problem has persisted across both apartheid and post-1994 governments. She criticized "solutionism" and argued that addressing these issues requires embracing the problem's complexity rather than seeking simplified engineering or policy solutions.

== Summary ==
Hecht traces the environmental and social legacy of gold and uranium mining in South Africa's Witwatersrand region, where over one-third of all gold ever mined on Earth was extracted across more than a century. The book develops the concept of "residual governance," defined as a deadly trifecta: the governance of waste and discards; minimalist governance that employs simplification, ignorance, and delay as core tactics; and governance that treats people and places as waste and wastelands. Hecht argues that residual governance functions as a technopolitical instrument of racial capitalism—where technology deliberately enacts political goals—and serves as a major accelerant of the Anthropocene epoch.

The book's introduction, "The Racial Contract is Technopolitical," builds on philosopher Charles Mills's theory of the racial contract to demonstrate how mining in South Africa exemplifies the intersection between racial capitalism and environmental destruction. Hecht shows how apartheid's racial contract guaranteed value extraction at minimal cost through the exploitation of hundreds of thousands of male mineworkers from across southern Africa, while simultaneously contaminating their bodies and communities with toxic residues. The narrative deliberately eschews chronological ordering, instead employing a palimpsest-like structure where geological time, colonial history, apartheid, and the post-apartheid present layer upon one another.

Chapter 1, "You Can See Apartheid from Space," provides the broadest temporal perspective, traversing three billion years from the meteor strike that created the Witwatersrand's gold-bearing geology through human habitation, imperialism, apartheid, and contemporary South Africa. The massive mine dumps visible from space serve as monuments to racial capitalism's environmental violence, with apartheid literally etched into the landscape.

Chapter 2, "The Hollow Rand," examines acid mine drainage—the toxic water that decants from abandoned mine shafts when groundwater fills the voids and reacts with exposed pyrite, turning acidic and dissolving heavy metals like arsenic, lead, and uranium. The chapter follows activist Mariette Liefferink's fearsome persistence in confronting this crisis, which contaminated water sources for over 400,000 people along the Wonderfonteinspruit catchment and became a focal point in post-apartheid South Africa's crisis of democratic legitimacy.

Chapter 3, "The Inside-Out Rand," addresses the staggering volumes of often radioactive dust and sand generated by mining operations, examining how photographers, artists, and scientists have documented this form of volumetric violence. The chapter engages with visual artists like Ernest Cole, Peter Abrahams, and David Goldblatt, demonstrating how images serve as both primary sources and forms of resistance that communicate aspects of environmental injustice beyond what words can capture.

Chapter 4, "South Africa's Chernobyl?," provides a detailed micro-history of the Tudor Shaft informal settlement in Kagiso township, where residents lived atop uraniferous mine tailings for over two decades while awaiting promised post-apartheid housing. The chapter follows community leader Jeffrey Ramoruti and his neighbors as they fought against their treatment as human waste, engaging municipal, provincial, national, and international governance scales in their ultimately successful struggle for relocation.

Chapter 5, "Land Mines," examines the metropolitan scale to demonstrate how the sheer volume and spatial extent of mine residues fundamentally constrains possibilities for spatially just urban planning throughout the Gauteng City-Region. The chapter reveals how mine dumps continue to shape patterns of segregation and inequality, with remediation efforts repeatedly thwarted by the scale of contamination, corporate shuffling that enables companies to evade rehabilitation responsibilities, and the Byzantine complexities of residual governance. The conclusion, "Living in a Future Way Ahead of Our Time," connects South Africa's mining waste crisis to planetary futures, arguing that the country's struggles offer essential insights for confronting global challenges in the Anthropocene—an epoch characterized by the accumulation of residues in many forms, from mine tailings to greenhouse gas emissions.

Hecht centers the perspectives of those who have resisted residual governance: activists like Mariette Liefferink and Jeffrey Ramoruti, community organizations, scientists, journalists, urban planners, and artists who have fought to make residual waste visible and to resist its dehumanizing effects. The book draws on two decades of archival work and fieldwork, incorporating extensive visual materials—87 illustrations including photographs, maps, and artworks—as primary sources that reveal the toxic beauty of mining landscapes and the human struggles within them. By documenting how decades of research, hundreds of studies, and major political upheavals have failed to adequately address mining's toxic legacy, the book demonstrates that residual governance gains traction through accretion: each layer of waste, each Byzantine regulation, and each instance of bureaucratic delay puts meaningful remediation further out of reach. The work ultimately argues that South Africa's experience reveals how racial capitalism's logic of infinite growth on a finite planet relies on treating certain people and places as disposable, offering a stark warning about emerging planetary politics in an age defined by the accumulation of toxic residues.

== Critical reception ==
Academic reviewers have analyzed the book's theoretical framework, particularly its development of "residual governance" as a concept linking waste management, bureaucratic minimalism, and the treatment of people and places as disposable. Iva Peša in the American Historical Review notes that Hecht "masterfully combines two vastly different scales" in showing connections between state and mining actors while documenting effects on residents. Tracy-Lynn Field and Michael Hennessy Picard in the European Journal of International Law describe it as "a gripping account of the mine wastes of the Rand, viewed from the perspective of activists and community leaders," and praised Hecht for honoring activists who "refuse to allow residual waste to escape unnoticed."

The book's use of Charles Mills's racial contract theory has drawn scholarly attention. Mikhail Moosa (African Studies Review) observes that the work "expands on her earlier work on technopolitics in France and West Africa, while drawing substantively on Charles Mills's critique of liberal social contract theory." Ivan Evans (Contemporary Sociology) analyzed how Hecht builds on Mills's framework to demonstrate what she terms a "deadly trifecta" of policies that expose South Africans to mining byproducts, official reliance on misleading information, and an administrative approach that "treats people and places as waste and wastelands." Evans noted that while some scholars might view the book's passionate tone as polemical, "the fierce tone of the book is appropriate to the Anthropocene."

Tholithemba Lorenzo Ndaba (South African Journal of Science) traces how Hecht connects environmental problems to "a racial contract functioning as a technopolitical entity, deliberately designing residues like mine dumps to achieve political objectives." While praising Hecht's writing style and use of primary sources including archival materials and photographs, Ndaba identified limitations including the book's tendency to generalize Johannesburg's issues to all of South Africa and what he views as insufficient incorporation of community voices through interviews, particularly regarding the Tudor Shaft settlement.

Anne Heffernan (British Journal for the History of Science) reviews the book alongside Faeeza Ballim's work on South Africa's electricity sector, and notes that both books address "the enduring communal and environmental impacts" of extractive industries. Mariaelena De Stefano's review in L'Uomo Società Tradizione Sviluppo characterizes the book as combining narrative and visual media, with images, maps, and photographs by local artists transforming the reader from "simple observer to conscious explorer." De Stefano points out that the work "is not a manual with easy solutions" and lauds Hecht for recognizing that "knowledge alone is not sufficient to generate change or promote reparative interventions." De Stefano emphasizes the book's call to "humanize where others—decision makers, politicians, bureaucrats, technicians—dehumanize" and to "not remain calm just to continue as always."

Nancy Jacobs describes the work as "a ferocious book about Gauteng's mine dumps as sacrifice zones of racial capitalism" and "an essential exposé of the depredations that define our current epoch, the Anthropocene." Jacobs explains the multiple layers of the title's meaning—from state regulation of waste, to minimized regulation, to the management of places and people as wastelands. She stresses Hecht's use of the term "wicked problems" for issues with contested definitions and no single optimal solutions, and praised her ability to make "technological complexity manageable for a humanities audience". Jacobs also emphasized the author's effectiveness as "a voice against obfuscation," and the book's attention to artists including Peter Abrahams, Ernest Cole, and contemporary photographer Potšišo Phasha, as well as its centering of activists like Jeffrey Ramoruti and Mariette Liefferink. She describes Hecht's voice as "by turns witty, unbelieving, impatient, and outraged" and says that the book offers important lessons: "Community matters. Knowledge matters. Storytelling matters. There is no alternative to perseverance, struggle, and honest thought."

Lorenzo Olivieri and Alessio Gerola in Tecnoscienza describe the book as "a marvelous work that focuses on the strategies used by mining companies and South Africa's governments to (not) manage the various kinds of waste and hazardous substances produced by mining activities."

=== Africa roundtable ===
Africa published a roundtable of the book, with three reviews and a response by Hecht. Lorenzo D'Angelo characterizes the narrative structure as one that "loops and spirals through time," creating what he describes as a work "written in honest anger, with stunning vehemence and exquisite one-liners." D'Angelo notes the book's extensive visual materials, including photographs from South African artists, and questiones why Hecht didn't adopt a more explicitly transnational approach, though he acknowledges the need for detailed empirical engagement. While, Jan-Bart Gewald describes reading the book as being "pummelled by a heavyweight," and says that "it is difficult not to walk away despondent and despairing, the issues she describes are so enormous, the damage so extensive." Despite this, Gewald argues that "such work has to be written, and it has to be read if we are ever to right the wrongs of the past." Melusi Nkomo situates the work within existing scholarship on post-apartheid South Africa, observing that while the story of apartheid's persistence has been told before, Hecht "carved her own niche out of the story" by focusing on residual governance in Gauteng Province. Nkomo credits Hecht for "organizing so many aspects into a coherent and captivating analysis" and for "painting a generous picture of the continuing struggle for social justice in the rubble of capitalism," though he suggests the book implies rather than directly presents answers to why mining residues remain such a persistent problem.

The author responded to reviews by Nkomo, D'Angelo, and Gewald. Hecht defends her methodological choices, explaining that "refusing to produce a short, quotable response is my way of resisting the solutionism sought by so-called sustainability studies." She clarifies that residual governance "gains traction through accretion" with each layer of waste and regulation putting "resistance and repair further out of reach." Regarding D'Angelo's question about geographic scope, she acknowledges originally intending a transnational approach but explained that "challenging the fictions of 'sustainable development' required detailed empirical engagement."

== Awards ==
- 2024 PROSE Award in Government and Politics, Association of American Publishers
- 2024 PROSE Award for Excellence in Social Science, Association of American Publishers
- 2024 E. Ohnuki Tierney Award for Historical Anthropology, American Anthropological Association
- 2024 Best Book Award, African Studies Association
- Third Place, Victor Turner Award for Ethnographic Writing, Society For Humanistic Anthropoloy
- Finalist, Fleck Prize, Society for the Social Studies of Science
