= Njinga of Angola: Africa's Warrior Queen =

Biography of an African queen

- Author: Linda M. Heywood
- Language: English
- Subject: Biography, History
- Genre: Non-fiction
- Publisher: Harvard University Press
- Publication date: 2017
- Publication place: United States
- Media type: Hardback, paperback, eBook
- Pages: 320
- ISBN: 978-0674237445
- OCLC: 979560421
- Website: Harvard University Press

Nzinga (Note: Njinga Mbande, also known as Nzinga, Njingha, and Ana de Sousa, was queen of Ndongo and Matamba. Her native title was Ngola Njinga, meaning ruler. See Nzinga of Ndongo and Matamba#Name variations for further details.)
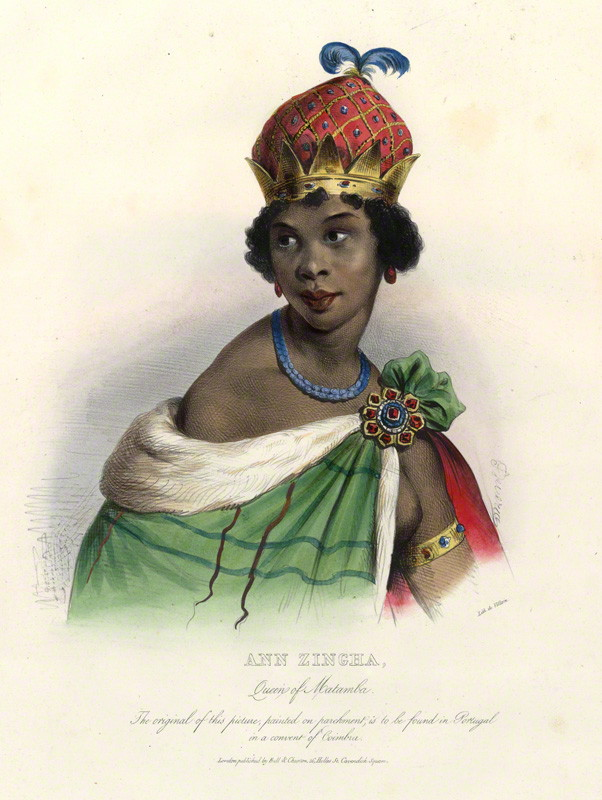
- Posthumous lithograph of Nzinga of Ndongo and Matamba by Achille Devéria, 1830s, after a portrait on parchment stored in a convent in Coimbra. National Portrait Gallery, London
- Reign: 1624–1626 (first period), 1627-1656 (resistance and exile), 1657–1663 (second period).
- Born: c. 1583; Kabasa, Kingdom of Ndongo
- Died: 17 December 1663 (aged 79–80); Kabasa, Kingdom of Ndongo
Names
- Njinga Mbande

Njinga of Angola: Africa’s Warrior Queen is a 2017 biography written by Linda M. Heywood and published by Harvard University Press. The book explores the life of Nzinga of Ndongo and Matamba.

== Background ==
Nzinga Ana de Sousa Mbande (c. 1583–1663) was queen of Ndongo and Matamba, 17th century kingdoms in the area currently Angola, during Portuguese colonial rule and the Atlantic slave trade. Nzinga ruled approximately from 1624 until her death in 1663, a reign of about 39 years.

== Synopsis ==
Njinga of Angola: Africa’s Warrior Queen is a biography of Nzinga of Ndongo and Matamba, a 17th-century ruler of the Mbundu people in the region now known as Angola. The book uses both Portuguese colonial records and African oral traditions, focusing on Nzinga’s life during Portuguese colonial expansion and the rise of the Atlantic slave trade. The work covers Nzinga’s political, military, religious, and diplomatic leadership, her use of political Christianity, and how gender and her adoption of male identity traits impacted her reign.

== Structure ==
Contents include:

- Introduction — Overview of Queen Nzinga’s reign and her portrayal by Europeans.
1. The Ndongo Kingdom and the Portuguese Invasion — History of Ndongo kingdom and early Portuguese contact and conflict.
2. Crisis and the Rise of Nzinga
3. A Defiant Queen
4. Treacherous Politics
5. Warfare and Diplomacy
6. A Balancing Act
7. On the Way to the Ancestors
- Epilogue
- Glossary — Definitions of terms
- List of Names — Key persons mentioned
- Chronology — Timeline of major events

== Reception ==
- Buri, Maryann (2018). "Review: Njinga of Angola: Africa's Warrior Queen". The International Journal of African Historical Studies. 51 (1): 174–175.
- Gordon, David M. (2018). "Africa's Warrior Queen: Reviewed Work: Njinga of Angola: Africa's Warrior Queen". The Journal of African History. 59 (2): 305–307.
- Hardesty, Jared Ross (2018). "Njinga of Angola: Africa's Warrior Queen, written by Linda M. Heywood". Journal of Jesuit Studies. 5 (1): 165.
- Hosking, T. (2018). "Njinga of Angola: Africa's warrior queen". Women's History Review. 27 (3): 493–494. doi:10.1080/09612025.2018.1424738.
- Saidi, Christine (2018). "Reviewed Work: Njinga of Angola: Africa's Warrior Queen". Early Modern Women. 13 (1): 183–185.
- Vos, Jelmer; Heywood, Linda M. (2018). "Njinga of Angola: Africa's Warrior Queen". The American Historical Review. 123 (1): 358–359.

== Release information ==
Formats and editions:

- Hardcover: 2017, (First Edition), Harvard University Press, 320pp. ISBN 9780674971820.
- Paperback: 2019, Harvard University Press, 320pp. ISBN 9780674237445.
- eBook and Kindle: 2017, Harvard University Press. ISBN 9780674979055

== Similar or related works ==
- Nzinga: African Warrior Queen by Moses L. Howard (2016).

== About the author ==
Linda M. Heywood is a Caribbean-American historian specializing in African history and the African diaspora. She earned her bachelor's degree from Brooklyn College and her Ph.D. from Columbia University. Heywood is currently a professor at Boston University; they formerly taught at Howard University. In addition to Njinga of Angola: Africa’s Warrior Queen she co-wrote Central Africans, Atlantic Creoles, and the Foundation of the Americas, which won the Melville Herskovits Prize. She was elected to the American Academy of Arts and Sciences in 2020.

== See also ==
- History of Angola
- Portuguese Angola
- Colonial history of Angola
- List of Rulers of Matamba
- List of Ngolas of Ndongo
- List of women who led a revolt or rebellion
