= Linda Heywood =

American historian (born 1945)

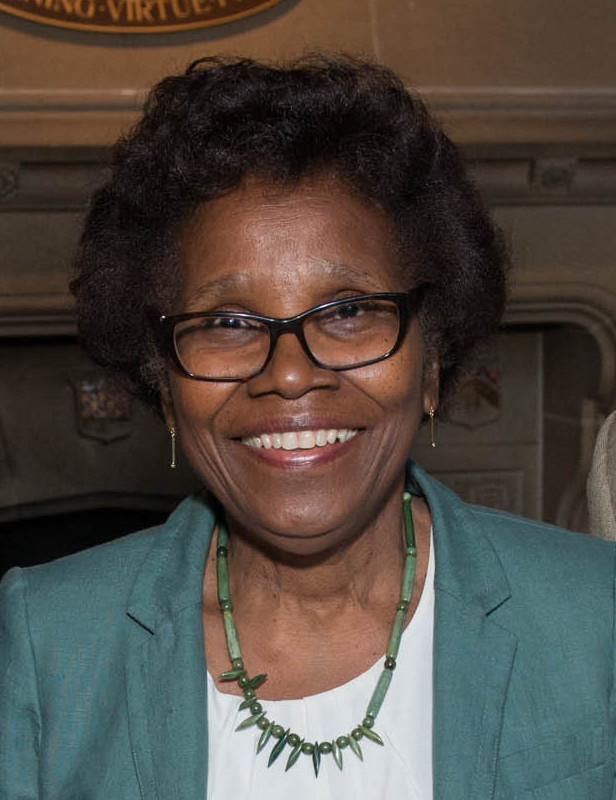
- Heywood in 2016
- Born: 1945 (age 80–81)
- Occupation: Professor
- Spouse: John Thornton
- Awards: 2008 Herskovits Prize (with John Thornton)

Academic background
- Education: Brooklyn College (B.A.); Columbia University (Ph.D.)

Linda Marinda Heywood (born Tunapuna, Trinidad and Tobago 1945) is a Caribbean-American historian and professor of African American studies and history at Boston University. Before coming to Boston University in 2003, Heywood taught at Howard University (1984-2003).

Heywood is a specialist in African history, with a particular interest in Angola. Her dissertation, published as Contested Power in Angola dealt with the transition of the Central Highlands kingdoms (Viye, Mbailundu, Wambo and others) from independence to colonial rule and included the liberation struggle and Angolan civil war from the 1840s to the 1990s. While at Howard, Heywood taught regularly in the required Black Diaspora class and became engaged in research on the African Diaspora, which resulted in the publication of her edited Central Africans and Cultural Transformations book and eventually Central Africans, Atlantic Creoles and the Foundation of the Americas. A long term interest in the life of Angolan Queen Njinga resulted in the publication of Njinga of Angola in 2017.

Heywood has a BA from Brooklyn College and a PhD from Columbia University. In 2008, she shared the Herskovits Prize for her book (co-authored with her husband John Thornton) Central Africans, Atlantic Creoles, and the Foundation of the Americas, 1585-1660. She was elected to the American Academy of Arts and Sciences in 2020.

== Selected publications ==
- Contested Power in Angola, 1840s to the Present. University of Rochester Press, Rochester, 2000. ISBN 1580460631
- Central Africans and Cultural Transformations in the American Diaspora. Cambridge University Press, 2001. (editor and contributor) ISBN 978-0521802437
- Central African, Atlantic Creoles, and the Foundation of America 1585-1660. Cambridge University Press, 2007. (with John Thornton) ISBN 978-0521770651
- Njinga of Angola: Africa's Warrior Queen. Harvard University Press, 2017. ISBN 978-0674971820
