= Derek R. Peterson =

American historian

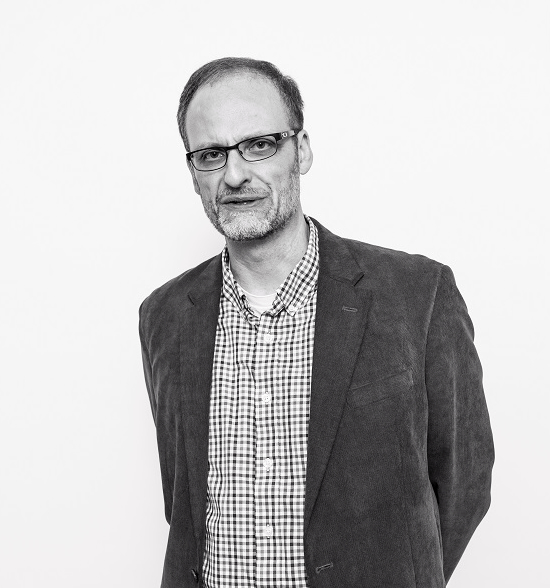
Derek R. Peterson

Derek R. Peterson (born May 13, 1971) is an American historian specializing in the cultural history of East Africa. He is currently a professor of history and African studies at the University of Michigan. In 2025 he was elected chair of the university's faculty senate. In 2026 he was elected member of the American Academy of Arts and Sciences.

He was the recipient of a MacArthur "Genius Grant" in 2017.

== Education and career ==
Born May 13, 1971, Peterson is from Maine, New York and attended Maine–Endwell High School. He studied history and political science at the University of Rochester and graduated in 1993. His interest in African studies was sparked by a trip to Kenya in his sophomore year, and at Rochester he studied under African scholars Elias Mandala and Sam Nolutshungu. After graduating, he was awarded a Fulbright grant to study in Kenya for a year. He then went on to the University of Minnesota, studying with Allen Isaacman, and obtained his PhD in 2000.

Peterson taught at the College of New Jersey between 2000 and 2004. Between 2004 and 2009 he was the director of Centre for African Studies at the University of Cambridge, where he edited a series of monographs on African studies, and initiated an academic exchange programme between Cambridge and universities in Africa.

He took a position at the University of Michigan in 2009, joining its newly founded African Studies Center (ASC). Peterson teaches undergraduate courses on African literature, African Christianity, and family history in a global context.

Peterson has been a visiting fellow at the University of Notre Dame's Kellogg Institute, was elected a Corresponding Fellow of the British Academy in 2016, and was awarded a Guggenheim Fellowship in 2016. He won the African Studies Association's 2013 Hersokovits Prize for his book Ethnic Patriotism and the East African Revival.

Peterson was chair of the University of Michigan’s Faculty Senate and Senate Advisory Committee on University Affairs until April 2026 when he stated "My time as chair of the Faculty Senate is now at an end, and I will soon be returning to a life of dignified obscurity”.

=== 2026 commencement address ===
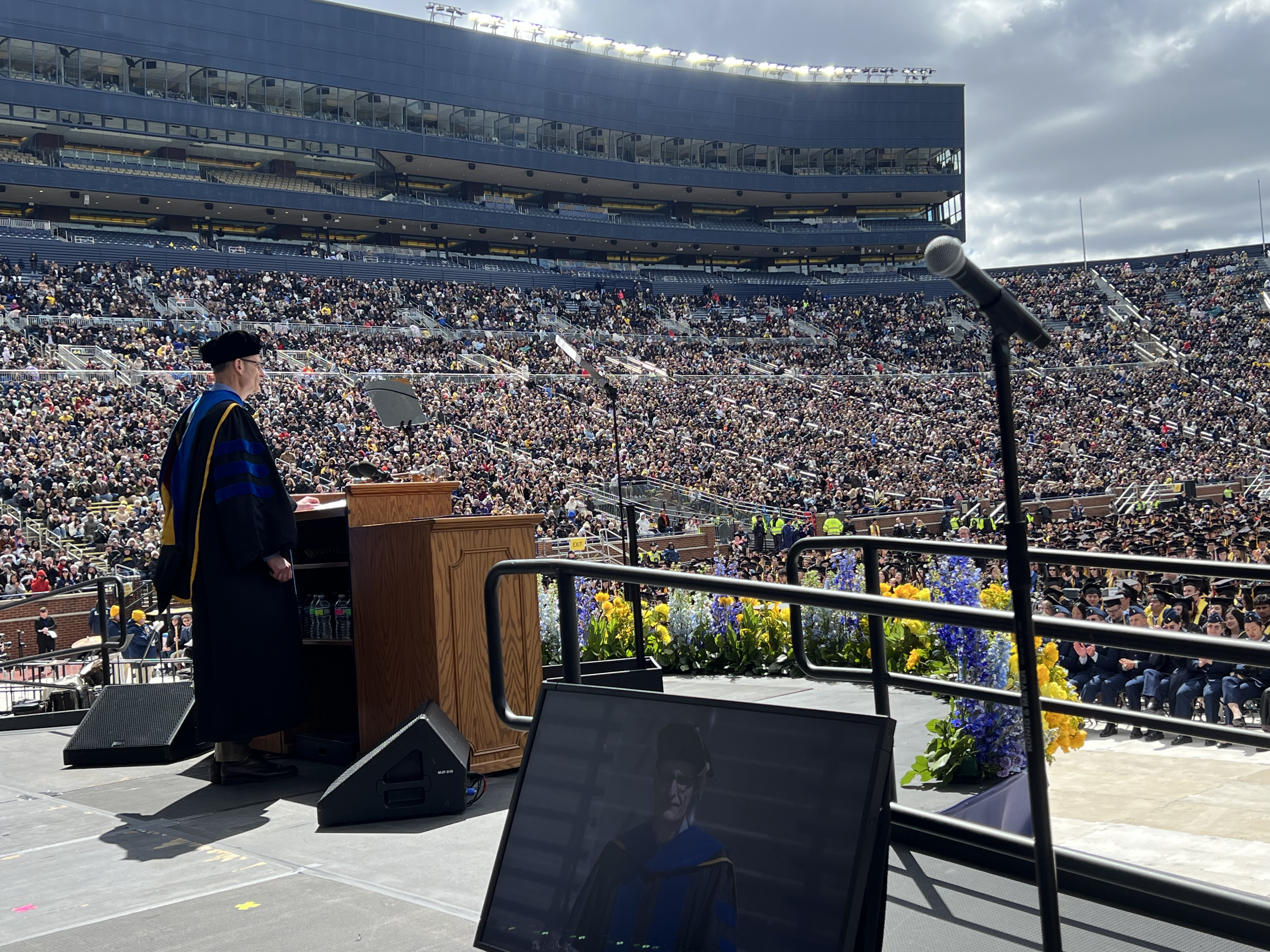
Peterson speaking at the Spring 2026 commencement ceremonies at the University of Michigan

On December 14, 2025 at the University of Michigan's Winter Commencement ceremony, Peterson said "our history is full of victors valiant who have organized themselves against racism, who have risen to defend the humanity of suffering people in the plantations of the old South, in the concentration camps of Hitler’s Germany, in the townships of apartheid South Africa, and in the ruined cities of Palestine.”

On May 2, 2026, Peterson delivered an address at the University of Michigan's Spring Commencement ceremony. In his address, he praised "pro-Palestinian student activists who have, over these past two years, opened our hearts to the injustice and inhumanity to Israel’s war in Gaza."

Peterson said,

"Sing for Moritz Levy, the first Jewish professor at the University of Michigan, appointed professor of French in 1896. He was to open the doors of this great university's generations of Jewish students who found Ann Arbor a safe haven from the antisemitism of the East Coast universities. Sing for the students of the Black Action Movement, whose members demanded a curriculum that would reflect the experience and identity of Black people in this country. Sing for the Pro-Palestinian student activists who have over these past two years opened our hearts to the injustice and inhumanity of Israel's war in Gaza. The greatness of this institution does not only rest on the shoulders and on the accomplishments of our student athletes, who deserve all the congratulations we can offer them. But the greatness of this university rests also on the courage and the conviction of student activists who have pushed this university down the path toward justice."

Earlier in 2026, Peterson said the appointment of Kent Syverud as President of the University of Michigan was "on balance ... a good appointment: he’s interested in consultation and discussion, he’s learned to take faculty members’ views seriously, he’s committed to racial and social justice". He did criticise Syverud for "clamp[ing] down on activists protesting against Israel’s genocide in Gaza".

==== Reactions ====
Peterson’s commencement speech drew mixed reactions. The remark that pro-Palestinian protesters had "opened our hearts to the injustice and inhumanity of Israel’s war in Gaza” received loud and long applause from the audience. Wayne State University Law Professor Jennifer Taub supported Peterson's speech. The Anti-Defamation League later said that the remarks were inappropriate for a graduation ceremony and could leave Jewish students feeling excluded. A current Regent as well as two Republican-endorsed candidates for the 2026 Michigan Board of Regents issued statements criticising Peterson's speech. Michigan Hillel, a pro-Israel campus organization representing Jewish students, condemned the speech as politicized, “deeply troubling”, and not inclusive, while the pro-Palestine Jewish Voice for Peace issued a statement praising the speech and condemning the Michigan president's response.

Peterson later responded to the criticism in The Michigan Daily, saying it should not be controversial to acknowledge the humanitarian impact of the war in Gaza and stressing the importance of empathy with other people’s suffering.

On May 2, 2026, University of Michigan President, Domenico Grasso, published a "Message to the Community titled "Spring 2026 Commencement SACUA Chair address response", which Grasso described as "hurtful and insensitive to many members of our community. We regret the pain this has caused on a day devoted to celebration and accomplishment. For this, the university apologizes." According to Grasso, Peterson

"deviated from the remarks he had shared before the ceremony. The Chair’s comments were inappropriate and do not represent our institutional position. Nor do they represent the diversity of views across our entire faculty. Everyone in our community is entitled to their own views; but this was neither the time nor the place. Commencement is a time of celebration, recognition and unity. The Chair’s remarks were expected to be congratulatory, not a platform for personal or political expression. Introducing such commentary in this setting was inappropriate and did not align with the purpose of the occasion. "

In an interview with The Chronicle of Higher Education, Peterson said that he deviated only slightly from the wording of the remarks he had submitted to the university in advance, saying that he realized in the moment that more clarity was needed. The remarks he had submitted referenced activists who had “sacrificed much to open our hearts to the injustices happening in Gaza," according to the text provided to the Chronicle by the university.

== Selected publications ==
=== Monographs ===
- Ethnic Patriotism and the East African Revival: A History of Dissent. Cambridge University Press. 2012.
- Creative Writing: Translation, Bookkeeping, and the Work of Imagination in Colonial Kenya. Heinemann. 2004.
- A Popular History of Idi Amin's Uganda. Yale University Press. 2025.

=== Edited volumes ===
- Peterson, Derek R.; Hunter, Emma; Newell, Stephanie, eds. (2016). African Print Cultures: Newspapers and their Publics in Modern Africa. University of Michigan Press.
- —; Gavua, Kodzo; Rassool, Ciraj, eds. (2015). The Politics of Heritage in Africa: Economies, Histories, and Infrastructures. Cambridge University Press.
- —, ed. (2010). Abolitionism and Imperialism in Britain, Africa and the Atlantic. Ohio University Press.
- —; Macola, Giacomo, eds. (2009). Recasting the Past: History-Writing and Political Work in Modern Africa. Ohio University Press.
- —; Walhof, Darren, eds. (2002). The Invention of Religion: Rethinking Belief in Politics and History. Rutgers University Press.
