= James W. Fernandez =

American anthropologist

- Born: November 27, 1930 (age 95); Chicago, Illinois
- Awards: Guggenheim Fellowship, 2003

Academic background
- Education: BA, Amherst College, 1952; PhD, Northwestern University, 1962

Academic work
- Discipline: Anthropologist
- Institutions: Dartmouth College; Princeton University; University of Chicago

James W. Fernandez (born 1930) is an American anthropologist. He has written extensively and developed several theories, though his primary work is in the rhetorical camp of anthropology and focuses on the role of metaphors and tropes in culture. Fernandez is influenced by postmodernism, which he uses as a lens through which to conduct anthropology. He has conducted fieldwork in Spain and West Africa, most notably among the Fang people regarding the Bwiti cult, as represented by his work Bwiti. Fernandez has taught at several American universities and continues to teach as a professor emeritus of anthropology and social sciences at the University of Chicago. He earned a Guggenheim Fellowship for research in the social sciences in 2003.

== Early life and education ==
James W. Fernandez was born on the 27th of November 1930 in Chicago, Illinois, United States. He was raised as a young child in Galva Illinois and moved to Oak Park in 1939. He graduated from Oak Park High School in 1948. He received his B.A. from Amherst College in 1952. After Amherst he continued his education at Northwestern University. In addition he studied at the University of Madrid from 1954 to 1955 and the Museo Ethnologico de Barcelona. He received his Ph.D. from Northwestern University in 1962. As a student, he began research in Asturias in Northern Spain.

== Field work ==
=== Spain ===
Fernandez conducted his first fieldwork in Northern Spain. While he would spend considerable time in Africa, he would ultimately return to his research in Spain. When Fernandez returned to Spain in the 1970s, he began in earnest to finish his research which is still continuing. He focused on the cultural change in a mountainous area of Northern Spain called Asturias. His main informants were miners and cattle herders that lived in the area. He recorded specific ethnographic interactions and events, including things like interactions between men and women on the bus, folklore, and children's games. Fernandez published many articles about Spain and his research there influenced his writing, including his book Persuasions and performances. In addition to this book, he wrote many articles on the basis of his field-notes from Spain. These articles include: “Andalusia on Our minds: Two contrasting places in Spain as seen in a vernacular Poetic Duel of the Late 19th Century”, “Review: Consciousness and Class in Southern Spain”, and “Provocations of European Ethnology.”

=== The Fang: Fieldwork with the Bwiti ===
In 1960 Fernandez began his first fieldwork in Africa. He traveled to Gabon to work with a religious group called the Bwiti. The Bwiti are a religious movement that started after World War I in response to the stress of French colonialism and missionaries. Bwiti is the expression of social collapse while the cultural lexicon is still intact; the group is a blend of historical influences, folklore and Christianity. The ritualistic aspect of Bwiti is shown in a long elaborate ceremony that represents the journey between life and death. The ceremony is accompanied by small doses of psychedelic plants. Fernandez sought to understand the Fang and the Bwiti practices: he focused on metaphors and how they are acted out. He stated:

To search for the Bwiti order in codified form, although it may gratify a western need for abstractions of that kid, yet misses the Bwiti moral oder where it reposes: in the images and actions of Bwiti myths and legends, in the night-long rituals and accompany song cycle, in the architectonic of the cult house, and in the midnight “evangilies” of cult leaders, the moral order is more acted out than spelled out, more ritualistic than didactic…it is as much as anything a kinesthetic oder that is gradually exposes to the membership in the process of their worship.

Fernandez published his findings in multiple articles including: “Principles of Opposition and Vitality in Fang Aesthetics”, “Christian Acculturation and Fang Witchcraft”, “Fang Architectonics”, “Symbolic Consensus in a Fang Reformative Cult”, “Fang Reliquary Art: Its Quantities and Qualities”, and “Bwiti: An Ethnography of the Religious Imagination in Africa”.

=== Additional field work ===
In addition to his fieldwork in Spain and with the Fang, Fernandez conducted several other studies. In 1958–1959 he studied the culture of change in Río Muni and Gabon. For a year in 1960 he conducted ethnohistorical research Germany and France. From 1965 to 1966 he conducted research in other parts of Africa focusing on change in Zulu culture and change in Ewe-Adza culture.

== Theory and use of tropes ==
Fernandez is most known for his writings and theories regarding tropes. Fernandez builds upon the traditional meaning of trope to include “the metaphoric assertions men make about themselves or about others”. In this way tropes can be seen as a connection between metaphors and actions. In the words of Jerry D. Moore in his book Visions of culture:

Fernandez frequently refers to the “movement” in this process, transitions from an ill-defined or vague status to one that is concert and specific. That movement from the ill-defined to the specific characterizes semantic metaphors (“my love is a red, red rose”) and also social metaphors (“Men are dirty pigs”). Moment from the vague to the concrete also characterizes symbolic action during ritual.

It is this focus on change, and the use and interplay of tropes that guides the ethnographic field research of Fernandez. Focusing on tropes requires a huge effort however on the part of the researcher, they must perform a lot of participate observation, and formulate a cultural lexicon that is unique to that particular society. Fernandez borrows some ideas from the field of linguistics and uses them to formulate his ideas of seeing culture as a complex and continuous play of tropes. While his theories about tropes influenced all of his writing, they are most concisely expressed in two publications: Persuasions and performances; the play of tropes in culture and Beyond Metaphor: the theory of tropes in Anthropology.

== Post-modern influence ==
Many of the theories and publications of Fernandez can be classified as being influenced by postmodernism. The postmodernist approach in anthropology can most clearly be seen in ethnography. It shies away from seeing cultures as examples of far reaching theories (like functionalism, cultural materialism, or structuralism) and turns the focus to an “ethnography of experience” that is emic in nature and requires new methods. Fernandez used the term “immaculate perceptions” to point out that perceptions are never true reflections of reality, they cannot be separated from the background of the viewer. Postmodernism in anthropology seeks to do several things; it states there is never one truth but several, models of society in anthropology are influenced but the culture of those who create them, anthropologists must find a way to identify and order symbols and concepts by the framework and understanding of the society in question. This is in opposition to the traditional model of viewing symbols and actions and seeing how they fit in all encompassing western based societal theories.

== Teaching ==
Fernandez has taught at several American universities. Fernandez started his teaching career at Smith College as a teaching assistant. In 1964 he changed schools and started teaching at Dartmouth College. From 1971–1975 he was chair of the department of anthropology at Dartmouth College. After Dartmouth he left to teach at Princeton University where he also became department chair in 1978. He then taught at the University of Chicago until he retired in 2000. He was a professor of Anthropology and Social sciences and currently holds the title of professor emeritus. Fernandez also taught abroad. He lectured in Germany and Spain on “contemporary native religious movements in Africa”. From 1962 to 1966 he was an occasional lecturer for the Peace Corps. In the Spring of 1993, Fernandez was a Fellow at the Swedish Collegium for Advanced Study in Uppsala, Sweden.

== Publications ==
Fernandez has written several books and many scholarly articles. He is credited for writing over 170 published works. Mostly notably are the books: Persuasions and Performances, Beyond metaphor, Bwiti: an Ethnography of the religious imagination, On symbols in Anthropology, Fang Architectonics, Divinations confessions testimonies, and The conditions of Reciprocal Understanding. A complete list of his published works is contained in his CV.
