= Adom Getachew =

Ethiopian-American political scientist

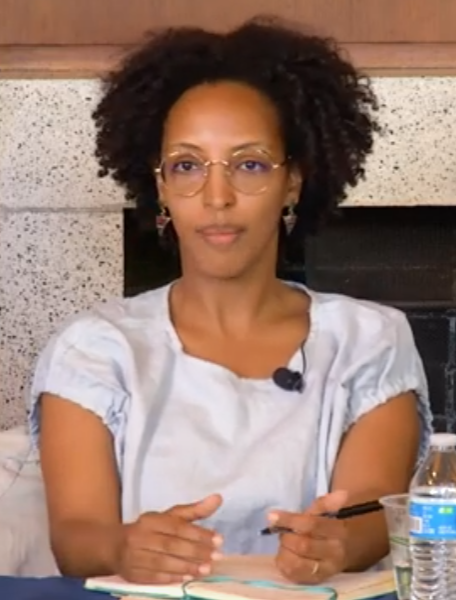
- Adom Getachew at the 2023 Tanner Lectures on Human Values

Academic background
- Education: University of Virginia, Yale University

Academic work
- Institutions: University of Chicago
- Main interests: history of political thought, theories of race and empire, and postcolonial political theory
- Website: political-science.uchicago.edu/directory/adom-getachew

Adom Getachew is an Ethiopian-American political scientist. She is Professor of Political Science and Race, Diaspora & Indigeneity at the University of Chicago. She is the author of Worldmaking after Empire: The Rise and Fall of Self-Determination.

Adom was awarded a PhD in Political Science and African-American Studies from Yale University in 2015. She was born in Ethiopia. She was raised in Ethiopia and Botswana until the age of 13, when her family moved to Arlington, Virginia, United States.

== Work ==
Her first book, Worldmaking after Empire: The Rise and Fall of Self-Determination (2019), centers the work of African, African American, and Caribbean anticolonial nationalists and their efforts to challenge the global hierarchy. Ultimately, she argues that legally decolonized countries face unequal legal, economic, and social integration in the international plane. These stratified relationships continue to perpetrate imperial structures.

In addition to her academic work, Getachew has been actively involved in curatorial projects. In 2024–2025, she was a co-organizer and curator of Project a Black Planet: The Art and Culture of Panafrica, presented at the Art Institute of Chicago in collaboration with MACBA Museu d’Art Contemporani de Barcelona and KANAL–Centre Pompidou Brussels. The exhibition brought together approximately 350 works by artists from Africa, the Americas, and Europe, examining Pan-Africanism as a cultural and political project.
