= Gabrielle Hecht =

Puerto Rican historian (born 1965)

- Born: 1965 (age 60–61); Puerto Rico
- Occupations: Professor, historian, ethnographer
- Partner: Paul N. Edwards
- Awards: African Studies Association Best Book Award (2024); E. Ohnuki-Tierney Book Award (2024); PROSE Awards (2024, 2 awards); Guggenheim Fellowship (2023); National Endowment for the Humanities Fellowship (2021); Rachel Carson Prize (2016); Martin A. Klein Prize (2012); Robert K. Merton Prize (2013); Henry Baxter Adams Prize (1999); Edelstein Prize (2001)

Academic background
- Education: University of Pennsylvania (MA, PhD); MIT (SB)
- Thesis: (1992)

Academic work
- Discipline: History, Science and Technology Studies, Anthropology
- Institutions: Stanford University (2017–2025; 1992–1998); University of Michigan (1999–2017)
- Main interests: STS, African history, environmental justice, mining, technopolitics, nuclear power
- Notable works: Residual Governance; Being Nuclear; The Radiance of France
- Notable ideas: Nuclearity, residual governance, technopolitics
- Website: gabriellehecht.org

Gabrielle Hecht (born 1965) is a Puerto Rican historian and scholar of science and technology studies (STS) who specializes in the history of mining, environmental justice in Africa, and nuclear technology. She is Research Associate at the Wits Institute for Social and Economic Research in South Africa. She developed the concepts of "technopolitics," "nuclearity," and "residual governance" in science and technology studies, and has written on the technopolitics of nuclear power and uranium mining in Africa.

Hecht's scholarship has received awards including the 2024 African Studies Association Best Book Award, the 2016 Rachel Carson Prize, and the 2012 Martin A. Klein Prize in African History. Her work has been translated into nine languages.

== Education and early career ==
Hecht was born in 1965 in Puerto Rico. She received a Bachelor of Science degree in physics from the Massachusetts Institute of Technology (MIT) in 1986, followed by a Master of Arts degree in history and sociology of science from the University of Pennsylvania in 1988. She completed her PhD in history and sociology of science at the University of Pennsylvania in 1992.

She began her academic career at Stanford University, serving as Acting Assistant Professor in the Department of History from 1992 to 1993, then as Assistant Professor from 1993 to 1998, with a courtesy appointment in the Department of French and Italian.

== Academic positions ==
In 1999, Hecht moved to the University of Michigan, where she spent 18 years in the history department. She was promoted to Associate Professor in 1998 and to Professor in 2011. At Michigan, she co-founded the Program in Science, Technology, and Society (STS) with her partner, Paul N. Edwards, and served as its Director from 2013 to 2015 and 2016 to 2017. She also served as Associate Director of Michigan's African Studies Center from 2013 to 2014 and participated in the Program in Anthropology and History.

In 2017, Hecht returned to Stanford University as Professor of History and Professor (by courtesy) of Anthropology. From 2017 to 2024, she held the Frank Stanton Foundation Professor of Nuclear Security position and served as Senior Fellow at the Freeman Spogli Institute for International Studies. Her affiliations at Stanford included the Center for African Studies, the Program in Science, Technology, and Society, the Center for Global Ethnography, the Program on Urban Studies, and the Program in History and Philosophy of Science.

Hecht maintains her role as Research Associate at the Wits Institute for Social and Economic Research at Wits University in South Africa, a position she has held since 2024.

Throughout her career, Hecht has held visiting positions at Sciences Po (France), École des Hautes Études en Sciences Sociales (France), the University of Oslo (Norway), Technische Universiteit Eindhoven (Netherlands), the University of KwaZulu-Natal (South Africa), the University of Melbourne (Australia), and the Royal Institute of Technology (Sweden).

== Research and scholarly contributions ==
=== Nuclear technology and technopolitics ===
Hecht's first book, The Radiance of France: Nuclear Power and National Identity after World War II (MIT Press, 1998; 2nd edition 2009), analyzed how France embedded nuclear policy in reactor technology and nuclear culture in reactor operations. The book introduced the concept of "technopolitics"—the strategic practice of designing or using technology to constitute, embody, or enact political goals. This work received the Henry Baxter Adams Prize in European history from the American Historical Association in 1999 and the Edelstein Prize from the Society for the History of Technology in 2001. It was translated into French as Le rayonnement de la France (2004, 2014).

=== Nuclearity and African uranium ===
Hecht's 2012 book Being Nuclear: Africans and the Global Uranium Trade (MIT Press and Wits University Press) analyzed Africa's place in the global nuclear order. The book introduced the concept of "nuclearity"—the technopolitical status of being nuclear, which is determined not by the presence of radioactive materials alone but by the assemblage of instruments, data, technological systems, infrastructures, national agencies, international organizations, experts, and media attention. Hecht argued that nuclearity is unevenly distributed globally, with consequences for which workers, communities, and nations receive protection, regulation, compensation, and recognition.

The book focused on uranium mines and miners in Gabon, Madagascar, Niger, Namibia, and South Africa, documenting how the global nuclear order depends on African uranium while denying African workers and communities the protections associated with nuclear status. Being Nuclear received several awards:

- Co-winner, 2012 Martin A. Klein Prize in African History, American Historical Association
- 2013 Robert K. Merton Book Award, American Sociological Association
- 2014 Susanne M. Glasscock Humanities Book Prize for Interdisciplinary Scholarship
- 2016 Rachel Carson Prize, Society for Social Studies of Science
- Honorable Mention, 2013 Herskovits Prize, African Studies Association

An abridged French version was published as Uranium Africain, une histoire globale (Le Seuil, 2016).

=== Residual governance ===
Hecht's 2023 book, Residual Governance: How South Africa Foretells Planetary Futures (Duke University Press, 2023), analyzed the environmental and health impacts of gold and uranium mining in South Africa's Gauteng province. The book introduced the concept of "residual governance," defined as a trifecta:

1. The governance of waste and discards
2. Minimalist governance that uses simplification, ignorance, and delay as tactics
3. Governance that treats people and places as waste and wastelands

Hecht argued that residual governance is an instrument of modern racial capitalism and an accelerant of the Anthropocene. The book documented how communities, experts, and artists fight for infrastructural and environmental justice in the face of abandoned mines, radioactive tailings, and toxic pollution. Rather than focusing on corporate and government archives, Hecht centered the perspectives of scientists, community leaders, activists, journalists, urban planners, and artists who have resisted residual governance.

Published in open access, Residual Governance received several awards:

- 2024 Best Book Award, African Studies Association
- 2024 E. Ohnuki-Tierney Book Award for Historical Anthropology, American Anthropological Association
- 2024 PROSE Award for Excellence in Social Sciences, Association of American Publishers
- 2024 PROSE Award in Government and Politics, Association of American Publishers
- 2025 Finalist, Ludwik Fleck Prize, Society for Social Studies of Science
- 2025 Third Place, Victor Turner Prize for Ethnographic Writing, Society for Humanistic Anthropology

The book has been translated into Spanish as Gobernanza residual: Como Sudáfrica presagia futuros planetarios (Qillqa, 2025) and will appear in French as Gouvernance résiduelle: le futur de la planète vu de l'Afrique du Sud (Éditions EHESS, 2026).

=== Latest research ===
Hecht's research project, Inside-Out Earth, studies the cumulative wastes of energy systems at four sites: the Norwegian Arctic (Svalbard), Abidjan in Côte d'Ivoire, Mpumalanga in South Africa, and the Atacama Desert in northern Chile. Conducted in collaboration with South African visual ethnographer and artist Potšišo Phasha, the project studies how residual governance operates in these locations and how people live with and within resulting wastes. Essays from this project have appeared in Cultural Anthropology, Aeon, Somatosphere, and other venues.

Hecht's 2018 article "Interscalar Vehicles for the African Anthropocene: On Waste, Temporality, and Violence" in Cultural Anthropology was the most downloaded article in the journal in 2018, and received the 2019 General Anthropology Division Prize for Exemplary Cross-Field Scholarship from the American Anthropological Association.

== Awards and honors ==
Book awards:

- 2024 Best Book Award, African Studies Association (for Residual Governance)
- 2024 E. Ohnuki-Tierney Book Award for Historical Anthropology, American Anthropological Association (for Residual Governance)
- 2024 PROSE Award for Excellence in Social Sciences (for Residual Governance)
- 2024 PROSE Award in Government and Politics (for Residual Governance)
- 2016 Rachel Carson Prize, Society for Social Studies of Science (for Being Nuclear)
- 2014 Susanne M. Glasscock Humanities Book Prize (for Being Nuclear)
- 2013 Robert K. Merton Prize, American Sociological Association (for Being Nuclear)
- 2012 Martin A. Klein Prize in African History, American Historical Association (for Being Nuclear)
- 2001 Edelstein Prize, Society for the History of Technology (for The Radiance of France)
- 1999 Herbert Baxter Adams Prize, American Historical Association (for The Radiance of France)

Fellowships:

- 2023–2024 John Simon Guggenheim Memorial Foundation Fellowship
- 2021–2022 National Endowment for the Humanities Fellowship
- 2024 Richard Lounsbery Foundation Officer Grant

Article awards:

- 2019 General Anthropology Division Prize for Exemplary Cross-Field Scholarship, American Anthropological Association (for "Interscalar Vehicles for the African Anthropocene")

Hecht's research has been supported by the National Science Foundation, the National Endowment for the Humanities, the American Council of Learned Societies, and the South African and Dutch national research foundations.

== Publications ==
=== Books ===
- Residual Governance: How South Africa Foretells Planetary Futures. Durham, NC: Duke University Press, 2023. ISBN 978-1-4780-2494-1 (Open access)
  - Spanish translation: Gobernanza residual: Como Sudáfrica presagia futuros planetarios. Qillqa, 2025.
  - French translation: Gouvernance résiduelle: le futur de la planète vu de l'Afrique du Sud. Éditions EHESS, forthcoming 2026.
- Uranium Africain, une histoire globale. Paris: Le Seuil, 2016.
- Being Nuclear: Africans and the Global Uranium Trade. Cambridge, MA: MIT Press and Johannesburg: Wits University Press, 2012. ISBN 978-0-262-01726-8
- (editor) Entangled Geographies: Empire and Technopolitics in the Global Cold War. Cambridge, MA: MIT Press, 2011. ISBN 978-0-262-51580-1
- The Radiance of France: Nuclear Power and National Identity after World War II. Cambridge, MA: MIT Press, 1998; 2nd edition 2009.
  - French translation: Le rayonnement de la France: Énergie nucléaire et identité nationale après la seconde guerre mondiale. Paris: Éditions de la Découverte, 2004; Éditions Amsterdam, 2014.
- (co-editor with Michael Thad Allen) Technologies of Power: Essays in Honor of Thomas Parke Hughes and Agatha Chipley Hughes. Cambridge, MA: MIT Press, 2001.

=== Articles and essays ===
- "Interscalar Vehicles for the African Anthropocene: On Waste, Temporality, and Violence." Cultural Anthropology 33, no. 1 (2018): 109–141.
- "AHR Conversation: History after the End of History: Reconceptualizing the Twentieth Century" (with Manu Goswami, Adeeb Khalid, Anna Krylova, Elizabeth F. Thompson, Jonathan R. Zatlin, and Andrew Zimmerman). American Historical Review 121, no. 5 (December 2016): 1567–1607.
- "Cenizas del Antropoceno: Omisiones de carbón y estratigrafía tóxica en el puerto de Tocopilla," with Cristóbal Bonelli, Damir Galaz-Mandakovic, Marina Weinberg, and Valentina Figueroa, La Revista Colombiana de Antropología, Vol. 60, Núm. 3 (2024).
- "Pas de nucléaire français sans uranium africain," in P. Singaravélou, A. Asseraf, G. Blanc, Y. Kisukidi, M. Lamotte, eds., Colonisations. Notre Histoire (Le Seuil, 2023)
- La Terre à l’envers: résidus de l’anthropocène en Afrique," L’Afrique des sciences sociales: bas, débats, combats, special 40th anniversary volume of Politique africaine, n. 161-162 (2021/1-2): 385-402.
- "Confronting African Histories of Technology: A Conversation with Keith Breckenridge and Gabrielle Hecht," with David Serlin, Radical History Review 127 (January 2017): 87-102.
- "History and the Technopolitics of Identity: The Case of Apartheid South Africa," with Paul N. Edwards, Journal of Southern African Studies 36:3 (September 2010): 619-639.
- "The Power of Nuclear Things," Technology and Culture 51 (January 2010): 1-30.
- "Africa and the Nuclear World: Labor, Occupational Health, and the Transnational Production of Uranium," Comparative Studies in Society and History, 51/4 (October 2009): 896-926.
- "The Work of Invisibility: Radiation Hazards and Occupational Health in South African Uranium Production." International Labor and Working Class History 81 (Spring 2012): 94–113.

=== Special issues edited ===
- "The Anthropocene, Apotheosis of Waste," special issue of Antipode, co-edited with Rosalind Fredericks and Mohammed Rafi Arefin (2024).
- "Toxicity, Waste, and Detritus in the Global South: Africa and Beyond," special issue of Somatosphere, co-edited with Pamila Gupta (Fall 2017).
- "Postcolonial Technoscience," special issue of Social Studies of Science 32, nos. 5–6, co-edited with Warwick Anderson (October–December 2002).

== See also ==
- Science and technology studies
- Environmental justice
- Nuclear power
- History of science
- Mining in South Africa
