= J. Lorand Matory =

American anthropologist

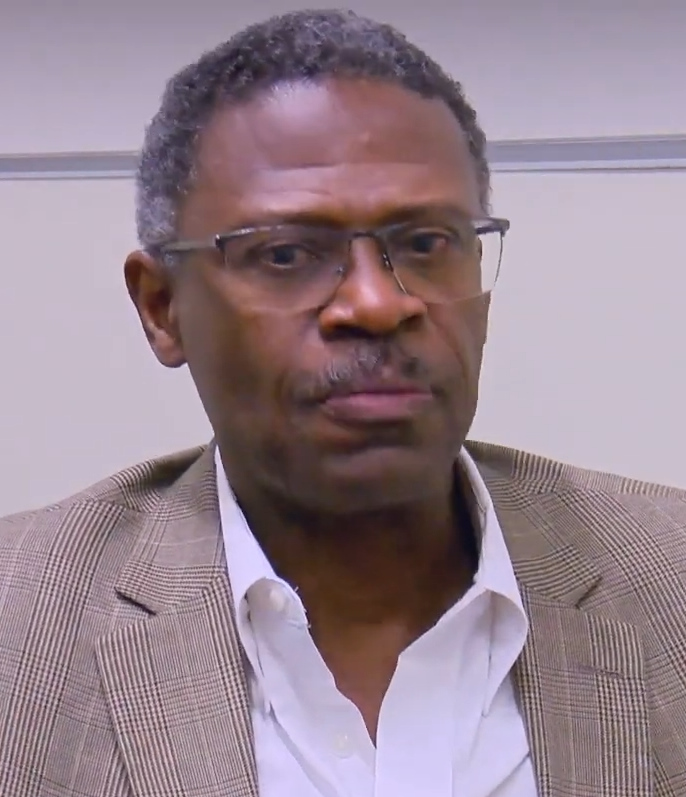
- J. Lorand Matory in 2020
- Occupations: Academic and professor
- Awards: Staley Prize (2022)

J. Lorand Matory is an American academic and Lawrence Richardson Professor of Cultural Anthropology and African and African American Studies at Duke University.

== Early life and education ==
Matory grew up in Washington, D.C., and attended Harvard College. He received his Ph.D. in anthropology from the University of Chicago in 1991.

== Career ==
Currently, he is Chair of the African and African American Studies department at Duke University. He is the author of Sex and the Empire That Is No More: Gender and the Politics of Metaphor in Oyo Yoruba Religion (Minneapolis, University of Minnesota Press 1994; Second, Revised Edition, New York and London: Berghahn Books, 2005); and Black Atlantic Religion: Tradition, Transnationalism and Matriarchy in the Afro-Brazilian Candomblé (Princeton; Princeton University Press, 2005).

Matory supports disinvestment from Israel. At one point, he criticized Larry Summers, then President of Harvard University, who called efforts by Matory and others to divest from Israel "anti-Semitic in effect, if not intent." According to Matory, "the knee jerk accusation that targeted criticism of Israel singles out Israel is as absurd as stating that the anti-apartheid movement was singling out South Africa."

In the summer of 2005, Matory was one of the leaders of a group calling for a faculty vote of no-confidence in University President Larry Summers. Although Matory had tenure at Harvard, he complained about issues regarding his compensation and diversity at the faculty, and when he received the offer to come to Duke in 2008, Harvard made a counter-offer that Matory considered inadequate before he accepted Duke's offer and left in the fall to take up his new position.
