= Martin A. Klein =

Africanist and history professor specialising in the Atlantic slave trade

Martin A. Klein (born 1934 in New York City) is an Africanist and an emeritus professor in the History Department at the University of Toronto specializing in the study of African slavery, and francophone West Africa: Senegal, Guinea, and Mali.

He has contributed to African historiography, with a focus on slavery, the slave trade, and the impact of colonialism on African societies. He is a past president of both the African Studies Association (U.S.) and the Canadian Association of African Studies.

== Biography ==
Klein was born in North Pelham, New York, and raised in Mt. Vernon, Westchester County.He graduated from A.B. Davis High School and attended an interracial conference sponsored by the National Conference of Christians and Jews.

He obtained a Bachelor of Arts degree in journalism at Northwestern University (1951-1955) where he wrote a regular column for The Daily Northwestern advocating racial and religious integration and served as president of Students for Democratic Action.

After military service, he pursued graduate studies in history at the University of Chicago, completing his M.A. in 1959 and Ph.D. in 1964. Initially focused on German history, he shifted to African history in response to the civil rights movement and the decolonization of Africa. His doctoral research centered on the establishment of French colonial rule and the conflict with Islam in the Sine-Saloum region of Senegal.

== Academic career ==
Klein began his teaching career at the University of Rhode Island (1961–62) and held fellowships at the Foreign Area Training Program and the University of Chicago’s Committee for the Comparative Study of New Nations. From 1965 to 1970, he was an assistant professor at the University of California, Berkeley, and served as a Fulbright lecturer at Lovanium University in Kinshasa, Congo, in 1968–69.

In 1970, Klein joined the University of Toronto, where he became professor of history in 1980 and served until his retirement in 1999. He has held visiting appointments at Wellesley College (2002–03) and Carleton College (2004–05).

== Scholarship ==
His scholarship centers on slavery within Africa, particularly in West Africa and Senegal.

His engagement with questions of race and racism dates back to his attendance at an interracial conference in 1951, shortly after graduating from high school, an experience that helped shape his political and scholarly interest in the subject.

His best-known monograph, Slavery and Colonial Rule in French West Africa (1998), analyzes the ways in which African slavery was reshaped under French colonial administration. A significantly expanded French edition was published in 2021 as Esclavage et Pouvoir Colonial en Afrique Occidentale Française, featuring an epilogue by Klein reviewing subsequent scholarship and a substantial preface by Senegalese historian Ibrahima Thioub.

Klein has co-edited volumes, including Women and Slavery in Africa (1983) with Claire C. Robertson, which brought attention to the complex roles of women as both slaves and slaveholders.

He later co-edited with Alice Bellagamba and Sandra Greene on a four-volume series exploring African slavery and its legacies of memory. His editorial contributions also include Breaking the Chains: Slavery, Bondage and Emancipation in Modern Africa and Asia, as well as the Oxford Encyclopedia of Slavery, the Slave Trade, and the Diaspora in African History, for which he served as editor.

Klein has contributed to the development of African historical scholarship through editorial roles with the Canadian Journal of African Studies (2000–2003) and the New Perspectives on African History series at Cambridge University Press.

=== Professional service and activism ===
Klein has held several leadership roles in academic associations.He served as president of the African Studies Association (U.S.) from 1990 to 1991 and of the Canadian Association of African Studies in 1982–83 and 2001–2002. He was vice president of both organizations and coordinated numerous academic conferences, including the 1994 ASA annual meeting in Toronto and a series of conferences on slavery and historical memory held in Bellagio (2007) and Toronto (2009).

He has also been politically active throughout his life, supporting the civil rights movement, the anti-Vietnam War movement, and the anti-apartheid struggle. In Canada, he was involved with the New Democratic Party and various grassroots initiatives.

He was a president of the African Studies Association (US, 1990-1991) and of the Canadian Association of African Studies. In 2001, Klein received a Distinguished Africanist Award from the African Studies Association. In 2010, the American Historical Association awarded the first annual Martin A. Klein Prize instituted in his name for the most distinguished work of scholarship on African history published in English during the previous calendar year.

== Selected publications ==
=== Books ===
- Klein, Martin A. (1968). Islam and imperialism in Senegal; Sine-Saloum, 1847-1914. Internet Archive. Stanford, Calif., Published for the Hoover Institution on War, Revolution, and Peace by Stanford University Press.
- Klein, Martin A.; Robertson, Claire, eds. (1983). Women and slavery in Africa. University of Wisconsin Press. hdl:2027/heb02068.0001.001. ISBN 978-0-435-07417-3.
- Klein, Martin A., ed. (1993). Breaking the chains: slavery, bondage, and emancipation in modern Africa and Asia. Madison London: University of Wisconsin Press. ISBN 978-0-299-13754-0.
- Klein, Martin A. (1998). Slavery and Colonial Rule in French West Africa. African Studies. Cambridge: Cambridge University Press. ISBN 978-0-521-59324-3.
- Klein, Martin A.; Miers, Suzanne, eds. (2013-05-13). Slavery and Colonial Rule in Africa. Routledge. doi:10.4324/9780203044759. ISBN 978-1-136-31993-8.
- Klein, Martin A. (2002). Historical dictionary of slavery and abolition. Historical dictionaries of religions, philosophies, and movements. Lanham, Md.: Scarecrow Press. ISBN 978-0-8108-4102-4.
- Bellagamba, Alice; Greene, Sandra E.; Klein, Martin A. (2013). African voices on slavery and the slave trade. New York: Cambridge University Press. ISBN 978-0-521-19470-9.
- Bellagamba, Alice; Greene, Sandra E.; Klein, Martin A., eds. (2013). The bitter legacy: African slavery past and present. Princeton: Markus Wiener Publishers. ISBN 978-1-55876-549-8.
- Klein, Martin A.; Bellagamba, Alice; Greene, Sandra E. (2016). African voices on slavery and the slave trade. Cambridge: Cambridge University Press. ISBN 978-0-521-19470-9.
- Bellagamba, Alice; Greene, Sandra E.; Klein, Martin A. (2017). African slaves, African masters: politics, memories, social life. The Harriet Tubman series on the African diaspora. Trenton, (N. J.): Africa World Press. ISBN 978-1-56902-443-0.
- Klein, Martin A. (1998-07-28). Slavery and Colonial Rule in French West Africa. Cambridge University Press. doi:10.1017/cbo9780511584138. ISBN 978-0-521-59678-7.

=== Journals ===
- Klein, Martin (1971). "Traditional Political Institutions and Colonial Domination". African Historical Studies. 4 (3): 659. doi:10.2307/216535. ISSN 0001-9992. JSTOR 216535.
- Klein, Martin A. (1978). "The Study of Slavery in Africa". The Journal of African History. 19 (4): 599–609. doi:10.1017/S0021853700016509. ISSN 1469-5138.
- Roberts, Richard; Klein, Martin A. (1980). "The Banamba slave exodus of 1905 and the decline of slavery in the Western Sudan". The Journal of African History. 21 (3): 375–394. doi:10.1017/s0021853700018363. ISSN 0021-8537.
- Klein, Martin A. (1981). "Report on Archives of the Popular and Revolutionary Republic of Guinea in Conakry". History in Africa. 8: 333–334. doi:10.2307/3171527. ISSN 0361-5413. JSTOR 3171527.
- Klein, Martin A. (1983). "From Slave to Sharecropper in the French Soudan: an Effort at Controlled Social Change". Itinerario. 7 (2): 102–115. doi:10.1017/s0165115300024244. ISSN 0165-1153.
- Klein, Martin A.; Roberts, Richard (1987). "The Resurgence of Pawning in French West Africa during the Depression of the 1930s". African Economic History (16): 23–37. doi:10.2307/3601268. ISSN 0145-2258. JSTOR 3601268.
- Klein, Martin A. (1989). "Studying the History of Those Who Would Rather Forget: Oral History and the Experience of Slavery". History in Africa. 16: 209–217. doi:10.2307/3171785. ISSN 0361-5413. JSTOR 3171785.
- Klein, Martin A., "The End of Slavery in French West Africa", Abolitions as a Global Experience, NUS Press Pte Ltd, pp. 199–227, doi:10.2307/j.ctv1qv3hg.13
- Klein, Martin A. (1998). "Slavery and French Rule in the Sahara". Slavery & Abolition. 19 (2): 73–90. doi:10.1080/01440399808575240. ISSN 0144-039X.
- KLEIN, MARTIN A. (2001). "The Slave Trade and Decentralized Societies". The Journal of African History. 42 (1): 49–65. doi:10.1017/s0021853700007854. ISSN 0021-8537.
