= Sigit Witjaksono =

Indonesian diplomat (borm 1966)

Raden Sigit Witjaksono

Ambassador of Indonesia to Sudan
- Incumbent
- Assumed office pending confirmation
- Preceded by: Sunarko Suwito

Personal details
- Born: 19 July 1966 (age 60) Bojonegoro, Central Java, Indonesia
- Education: Airlangga University (S.Hub.Int); International University of Japan (MA); Nagoya University (Dr.)

Raden Sigit Witjaksono (born 19 July 1966) is an Indonesian career diplomat who is currently nominated as ambassador to Sudan. He has held several positions within the Indonesian government, including as director of marketing for East and South Asia in the ministry of tourism and creative economy and, most recently, consul general in Kuching.

== Early life, education, and personal life ==
Born on 19 July 1966 in Bojonegoro, Sigit completed his bachelor's degree in international relations from the Airlangga University. He received his master's degree from the International University of Japan and his doctorate from the Nagoya University.

== Diplomatic career ==
Sigit entered the foreign ministry in March 1992. From 2006 to 2009, Sigit was noted to have served at the economic section of the embassy in Tokyo with the rank of second secretary. During his tenure in Japan, in December 2007 he received Burmese pro-democracy protesters who demanded Indonesia to take part in the resolution of the Myanmar conflict. He then returned to Indonesia for a stint as the head of administration section in the secretariat of the foreign ministry's policy assessment and development agency from 2009 to 2012. He was then sent to Myanmar, where he assumed the role as the head of the economics section and head of chancery with the diplomatic rank of counsellor.

Sigit returned to Indonesia to take up office as deputy director for Africa and Middle East in the directorate of technical cooperation from 2016 to 2018. Around the same time, he underwent senior diplomatic training. On 28 February 2018, Sigit was named as the assistant to the deputy of the second region marketing development for the third area in the ministry of tourism, responsible for promoting Indonesia's tourism in South and Central Asia as well as the Middle East and Africa. After the ministry of tourism was merged to form the ministry of tourism and creative economy in 2019, on 5 February 2020 Sigit was installed as the director in the deputy for marketing of the new ministry, with his jurisdiction reduced to South and Central Asia.

Sigit received his duties as consul general in Kuching, Malaysia, from acting consul general Budimansyah on 14 February 2022. He presented his exequatur to Yang di-Pertua Negeri of Sarawak Abdul Taib Mahmud on 23 February 2022. Throughout his three-year tenure in the country, Sigit oversaw major developments in cooperation with the Sarawak state government within the fields of economy, social, cultural, citizen protection, and manpower, including increasing the supply of electricity from Sarawak to neighboring Indonesian provinces of North Kalimantan and West Kalimantan. Sigit concluded his term on 30 April 2025 and returned to the foreign ministry.

On 10 August 2026, Sigit was nominated by President Prabowo Subianto as ambassador to Sudan. He underwent a parliamentary vetting process by the House of Representative's first commission on 22 September 2026.
