= Neither Settler nor Native =

2020 book

Neither Settler nor Native: The Making and Unmaking of Permanent Minorities
- Author: Mahmood Mamdani
- Language: English
- Publisher: Belknap Press
- Publication date: 2020

Neither Settler nor Native: The Making and Unmaking of Permanent Minorities is a 2020 book by Ugandan political theorist Mahmood Mamdani. Mamdani argues that nationalism and colonialism have common origins and are two sides of the same coin. He argues for responding to the violence inherent in the nation-state by rejecting the identities of settler and native and participating as equal citizens instead.

== Background ==
Mahmood Mamdani is a Ugandan political theorist. The intended audience of the book is "scholars of the liberal state, scholars of settler colonialism, and scholars of indirect rule colonialism". It follows Mamdani's earlier books, Citizen and Subject (1996) about the legacy of colonialism in Africa, When Victims Become Killers (2001) and Saviours and Survivors (2009), about large-scale violence in Rwanda and Sudan. The book is related to disagreements between Mamdani and Michael Neocosmos over the latter's 2016 book, Thinking Freedom in Africa. Mamdani decided to write the book after questioning some of the assumptions in his earlier books and realizing "that colonialism and nationalism were actually born together and represent two sides of the same coin".

== Content ==
Instead of the 1648 Treaty of Westphalia, Mamdani traces the origins of the modern state to 1492: the year of the expulsion of Jews and Muslims from Spain following the Reconquista, and simultaneously the beginning of the European colonization of the Americas. He argues that political modernity exists in the form of the nation-state; the birth of the nation-state forms both national majorities and national minorities, the latter of which are excluded from some rights. The nation-state is an inherently violent endeavor and efforts to homogenize it have triggered various episodes of ethnic cleansing and genocide.

Mamdani differentiates between immigrants and settlers: "Immigrants are unarmed; settlers come armed with both weapons and a nationalist agenda. Immigrants come in search of a homeland, not a state; for settlers, there can be no homeland without a state. For the immigrant, the homeland can be shared; for the settler, the state must be a nation-state, a preserve of the nation in which all others are at most tolerated guests."

The book draws on several case studies: the nineteenth century in the United States, which involved the dispossession of Native Americans and their concentration in Indian reservations; post-World War II Germany, in which he sees the Nuremberg trials as a failure that completed the Nazis' project of separating Germans from Jews; the end of apartheid in South Africa; Sudan and South Sudan, which separated after a civil war; and Israel/Palestine. Of these, the one Mamdani prefers is South Africa, which fits his model of rejecting the identities of settler and native in favor of becoming equal citizens, or "survivors".

Mamdani's book is underpinned by normative stances, such as his model of political modernity generating the nation state and hence mass violence, and against the use of criminal justice in responses to mass violence. Mamdani's argument is that since colonialism was the “making of permanent minorities and their maintenance through the politicisation of identity”, decolonization would require “unmaking of the permanence of these identities”.

He concludes:

Recognizing this history gives us the power to change perspectives and reality. The history of political modernity tells those of us who identify with the nation that we have been coopted. The nation is not inherent in us. It overwhelmed us. Political modernity led us to believe that we could not live without the nation-state, lest we not only be denied its privileges but also find ourselves dispossessed in the way of the permanent minority. The nation made the immigrant a settler and the settler a perpetrator. The nation made the local a native and the native a perpetrator, too. In this new history, everyone is colonized—settler and native, perpetrator and victim, majority and minority. Once we learn this history, we might prefer to be survivors instead.

== Reception ==
Congolese historian Jacques Depelchin described the book as "a landmark in trying to figure out how to transform the way humans relate to each other", but flawed in that in his view it overlooked relevant works on reconciliation by Cheikh Anta Diop, Théophile Obenga, Ayi Kwei Armah, and Yoporeka Somet and colonial legacies in postcolonial states. Sociologist Nandita Sharma describes the book as "an urgent intervention in contemporary politics" and "a searing critique of the nation-state". However, she argues that Mamdani does not adequately address all forms of postcolonial violence, such as border violence and the role of immigration restrictions in defining nation-states. She also disagrees with Mamdani's decision to treat colonial land appropriation and labor exploitation as separate processes.

Historian Eve M. Troutt Powell describes the book as "a grand narrative with which to review and revise our investment in our political identities", but criticizes the lack of a bibliography, absence of some relevant works, lack of attention to women and gender, and some of Mamdani's findings in the case studies. Reviewer Vivienne Jabri argues that Mamdani's concept of political modernity ignores the paradox that both violent and exclusionary forms of nationalism and the response to these that Mamdani advocates derive from modernity. She also argues that political and criminal justice are not dichotomous, as Mamdani argues. Despite her criticism, Jabri states that the book "will be of core interest both pedagogically and intellectually to understandings of conflict, political transformation, and responses to the extremes of violence in postcolonial states".

According to Elliott Green, Mamdani fails to engage with literature in nationalism studies and his argument would have been better served by a global history rather than case studies perspective. Stefan Andreasson argues that the most valuable aspect of the book is "Mamdani's argument about why a genuine process of decolonisation has proven elusive, but also how it might be attained". Fara Dabhoiwala describes the book as provocative and elegantly written, but cites limitations in its neglect of internationalism and "bold but selective abstractions".

== Accolades ==
In 2021, Neither Settler nor Native was shortlisted for the British Academy Book Prize for Global Cultural Understanding, and as "World History Finalist" by Association of American Publishers Awards for Professional and Scholarly Excellence (PROSE Awards).
