= Zubairu Wai =

Sierra-Leonean author

- Occupation: Academic
- Education: University of Sierra Leone; International University of Japan; York University
- Notable awards: Association of Third World Studies (ATWS) Toyin Falola Book Award 2013

Zubairu Wai is a Sierra-Leonean historian and political scientist. He is associate professor of political science and global development studies at University of Toronto. His appointment as the 8th Executive Secretary of Council for the Development of Social Science Research in Africa (CODESRIA) takes effect November 2026 according to official announcement. In 2013, he received the Association of Third World Studies (ATWS) Toyin Falola Africa book award for his book Epistemologies of African Conflicts: Violence, Evolutionism, and the War in Sierra Leone (2012). He is a member of the Anti-Imperialist Scholars Collective (AISC).

== Education ==
Wai studied at the University of Sierra Leone, graduating with an Honours BA degree in history. On full scholarship, he studied international relations at the International University of Japan, graduating top of his class with an MA in International Relations with high distinction in 2004. Under the supervision of Professor Ananya Mukherjee Reed at York University, Wai earned his PhD in political science in 2010, specialising in international relations and comparative politics, with research focus on Africa. His doctoral research was supported by the IDRC Doctoral Research Award, the Ontario Graduate Scholarship, and the Susan Mann Dissertation Scholarship.

== Career ==
Wai held a postdoctoral fellowship at York University's International Secretariat for Human Development in 2010 and was awarded a SSHRC Postdoctoral fellowship in 2011 to study under Congolese philosopher V.Y. Mudimbe at Duke University, but opted for a faculty appointment at Lakehead University. From 2010 to 2021, he taught in the Department of Political Science at Lakehead University. In 2021, he joined the Department of Global Development Studies at the University of Toronto Scarborough, with graduate appointment in the Department of Political Science at the St George campus.

== Scholarship and research ==
According to his faculty profile, Wai's "research takes up epistemological questions regarding the nature, conditions, and limits of disciplinary knowledge and practices in International Relations, Development Studies, Conflict and Security Studies, and African Studies. Specifically, he focuses on how the intersections of power and coloniality frame the discourses and political economy of knowledge, violence, conflict, development, and state formation in Africa, and the Global South more broadly." A review in the journal Africa Today (2013) highlighted his contribution to rethinking epistemological approaches to African conflict studies. Zubairu has authored books known to address epistemological questions, decolonization in Africa, Pan-Africanism, Knowledge production, Coloniality and Empire.

Wai is co-editor with Marta iniguez de Heredia of Recentering Africa in International Relations: Beyond Lack, Peripherality, and Failure (2018), which was praised in E-International Relations for challenging Eurocentrism in IR. In 2024, he published an edited volume Africa Beyond Inventions: Essays in Honour of V.Y. Mudimbe, described by Springer as a "rich critical engagement" with Mudimbe's work across multiple disciplines. He is also a co-editor of The Sage Handbook of Peace and Conflict Studies (2025). His forthcoming work, Thinking the Colonial Library: Mudimbe, Gnosis, and the Predicament of Africanist Knowledge is under contract with Routledge and scheduled for publication in 2026.

In November 2024, Wai delivered a keynote address titled "Indigenous African Knowledge and the Challenge of Epistemic Translation" at the AFRIAK Conference in Dakar, Senegal at a Council for the Development of Social Science Research in Africa (CODESRIA) launch of the African fellowships for Research in Indigenous and Alternative Knowledge conference. The address was published in CODESRIA Bulletin Online No. 6, reflecting his engagement with African research institutions. He also delivered a moving tribute to V.Y. Mudimbe at the CODESRIA Conference on Academic Freedom in Africa in Dar es Salaam, Tanzania in May 2025, celebrating his intellectual legacy. The tribute was published in CODESRIA Bulletin Online No. 4, 2025. He succeeds Godwin Murunga as the 8th Executive Secretary of CODESRIA with effects from November, 2026.

== Honours ==
Wai was awarded the ATWS Toyin Falola Africa Book Award for 2013, which he won for his book Epistemologies of African Conflicts: Violence, Evolutionism, and the War in Sierra-Leone (2012).

== Views ==
As a member of Anti-Imperialist Scholars Collective, an organization of scholars with a mission to resist imperialism, Wai has demonstrated solidarity with Palestine. He co-edited the book, The Sage Handbook on Peace and Conflict Studies (2025).

Along with other African intellectuals, Wai demanded for dialogue and conflict resolution between the Ethiopian government and the National regional government of Tigray.

== Influences ==
Wai's influences include reggae icon Peter Tosh for his uncompromising championing of the cause of anti-oppression and global justice. In his moving tribute to V.Y. Mudimbe at the CODESRIA Conference on Academic Freedom in Africa in Dar es Salaam, Tanzania in May 2025, he credited Mudimbe for teaching him to be an intellectual. And as can be seen in his published work, this influence is very strong.

== Selected publications ==
- Wai, Zubairu (2012). Epistemologies of African Conflicts: Violence, Evolutionism and the Civil War in Sierra-Leone. Springer. ISBN 9781137280794.
- Iñiguez de Heredia, Marta; Wai, Zubairu, eds. (2018). Recentering Africa in International Relations: Beyond Lack, Peripherality, and Failure. Springer. ISBN 9783319675091.
- Wai, Zubairu, ed. (2024). Africa Beyond Inventions: Essays in Honour of V. Y. Mudimbe. Springer. ISBN 9783031571190.
- Carter Hallward, Maia; Kim, Ji Eun; Mouly, Cécile; Seidel, Timothy; Wai, Zubairu, eds. (2025). The Sage Handbook of Peace and Conflict Studies. Sage. ISBN 9781529667752.
