= Sam Moyo =

Zimbabwean scholar

- Born: 1954; Salisbury, Rhodesia and Nyasaland
- Died: 2015 (aged 60–61); New Delhi, India

Academic background
- Influences: Amílcar Cabral, Frantz Fanon

Academic work
- Discipline: Agrarian Studies
- Institutions: African Institute for Agrarian Studies, Council for the Development of Social Science Research in Africa

Sam Moyo (1954–2015) was a Zimbabwean scholar and land reform activist, the co-founder and executive director of the African Institute for Agrarian Studies (AIAS) (renamed the Sam Moyo African Institute for Agrarian Studies following his death in 2015), and President of the Council for the Development of Social Science Research in Africa (CODESIRA). He was a research professor at the Zimbabwe Institute of Development Studies, and taught at the University of Zimbabwe.

Throughout his life, Moyo argued for, and was heavily involved in, land reform in Zimbabwe, taking an anti-colonial and Marxist approach to questions of land and labour. He published extensively on agrarian, rural and environmental issues, and founded the journal Agrarian South: Journal of Political Economy. His work, while interdisciplinary, is characterised by a strong critique of imperialism and neoliberalism, and he is well-regarded for his work in building knowledge networks among indigenous scholars in the Global South.

== Career ==
In 1995, Moyo published the book The Land Question in Zimbabwe, which argued that there were five dimensions to Zimbabwe's land question: distribution, utilization, tenure and adjudication, policy around each of which, he argued, further reinforced racial and gender injustice. Based on a detailed set of case studies, the book is described as "comprehensive", and an "exhaustive, multi-disciplinary overview" that "stresses that land is above all a political question and that the issue of race is central to it".

In 2000, Moyo was made head of the Land Reform Technical Advisory Team to the Government of Zimbabwe, which observed the Fast Track Land Reform Programme (FTLRP). He later argued against the characterisation of these radical land reforms as 'land grabbing', contending that such language "created a moral and political equivalence between the restitutive appropriation of colonially dispossessed lands for state-led land redistribution and the recent externally inspired land grabs in Africa, despite the latter's neoliberal roots", and that the reforms undermined the class structure of settler-colonial relations

In 2002, Moyo co-founded the African Institute of Agrarian Studies, a policy research organisation that worked toward equitable land rights and agrarian systems throughout the African continent, and remained its executive director until his death in 2015.

Moyo also founded the South-South research network Agrarian South, which includes the AIAS, Third World Forum, CODESRIA, CLASCO and IDEAS, and publisher of Agrarian South: Journal of Political Economy. In his role with the AIAS, Moyo also worked with the Zimbabwean Ministry of Lands to carry out the Provincial Dialogues on Land Reform, and was regularly called upon to provide commentary to Zimbabwean news outlets on agricultural issues.

Moyo was also outspoken on the centrality of issues of race and gender when it came to questions of land and labour, arguing that "white-settler capitalism organised the labour process such that white capital exercised both 'direct' and 'indirect' power over the indigenous black population", and that "unwaged female labour, would subsidise the social reproduction of male labour-power on mines and farms".

Moyo's work was described by the former director of the Makerere Institute of Social Research, Mahmood Mamdani, as "indispensable" in understanding the history of land reform in Zimbabwe.

== Death ==
On 20 November 2015, Moyo, along with two other academics, was involved in a car accident in Delhi, while attending a conference on "Labour Questions in the Global South". He died in hospital two days later as a result of his injuries. Moyo's family declined to have him memorialised as a national hero by the ZANU-PF party.

== Bibliography ==
Moyo published extensively throughout his career, working with a number of different scholars and agronomists to shape national agricultural policy in Zimbabwe, and contribute to agrarian scholarship across the African continent.

=== Books ===
- The Land Question in Zimbabwe (SAPES, 1995)
- Land reform under structural adjustment in Zimbabwe (Nordiska Afrikainstitutet, 2000)
- The Agrarian Question in the Neoliberal Era (Pambazuka, 2011)

=== Anthologies ===
- Reclaiming the Nation: The Return of the National Question in Africa, Asia and Latin America, with Paris Yeros (Pluto Press, 2011)
- Reclaiming the Land: The Resurgence of Rural Movements in Africa, Asia and Latin America, with Paris Yeros (Zed Books, 2013)

== See also ==
- Land reform in Zimbabwe
- Council for the Development of Social Science Research in Africa
