= Richard Mibey =

Kenyan mycologist and university administrator (born 1951)

Richard Kiprono Mibey
- Born: 12 December 1951 (age 74); Nyambugo, Bomet, Kenya
- Occupations: Mycologist, academic administrator
- Years active: 2006–2016
- Known for: Vice-chancellor of Moi University (2006–2016)

Richard Kiprono Mibey (born 12 December 1951) is a Kenyan academic, research scientist and university administrator. A professor of mycology, he served as vice-chancellor of Moi University from September 2006 to 2016. Before that he held a series of academic and administrative posts at the University of Nairobi and Maseno University.

== Early life and education ==
Mibey was born in Nyambugo, Sigor North Location in the then Bomet District, Kenya. He was educated at Sugumerga Primary School and Kericho High School. He took a BA in biology at Warren Wilson College in Swannanoa, North Carolina, graduating in 1976, followed by an MSc in biology at Appalachian State University in Boone, North Carolina in 1978. He then took an MSc in plant pathology at Oklahoma State University in Stillwater in 1981, and a D.Ed. in agricultural education and extension, specialising in plant pathology, at the same university in 1984.

He returned to Kenya and obtained a PhD in mycology from the University of Nairobi in 1996.

== Career ==
Mibey worked as a graduate assistant in the department of biology at Appalachian State University (1977–1978) and in the department of plant pathology at Oklahoma State University (1978–1983), and as a research assistant at the USDA laboratory in Stillwater, Oklahoma (1984–1985). He joined the University of Nairobi as a lecturer in the department of botany in 1986, becoming a senior lecturer in 1989, associate professor of botany (mycology) in 1997 and professor of mycology in 2002.

He was chairman of the department of botany at the University of Nairobi from 1998 to 2002, dean of the faculty of science from 2000 to 2002, and principal of the Chiromo campus from 2002 to February 2004. From February 2004 to September 2006 he was deputy vice-chancellor for administration and finance at Maseno University.

Mibey was appointed vice-chancellor of Moi University in September 2006 and held the post until 2016, when Laban Ayiro took over in an acting capacity.

== Scholarly work ==
Mibey's research is in fungal taxonomy and biodiversity conservation. His work includes the description of new species of fungi, research on fungi for the biological control of water hyacinth in Lake Victoria, and the documentation of micro-fungi of Kenyan plants.

He has held a DAAD senior research fellowship, a Darwin Fellowship (1994–1995) and a UNESCO fellowship. He is a member of the British Mycological Society and of the Committee on Biodiversity and Conservation of the International Association for Plant Taxonomy.

== Selected publications ==
- Mibey, R.K. & Hawksworth, D.L. (1995). "Diporothecaceae, a new family of ascomycetes and the term 'Hyphopodium'". Systema Ascomycetum 14: 25–31.
- Mibey, R.K.; Kokwaro, J.O. & Mukunya, D.M. (1996). "A new species and four new records of Asterina from Kenya". Nova Hedwigia 62: 147–150.
- Mibey, R.K.; Kokwaro, J.O. & Mukunya, D.M. (1996). "Four new species and some new records of meliolaceous fungi from Kenya". Mycotaxon 57: 87–95.
- Mibey, R.K. & Hawksworth, D.L. (1997). "Meliolaceae and Asterinaceae of the Shimba Hills, Kenya". Mycological Papers 174: 1–108.
- Mibey, R.K. (1997). "Sooty mould fungi". In Ben-Dov, Y. & Hodgson, C.J. (eds). Soft Scale Insects: Their Biology, Natural Enemies and Control. World Crop Pests 7A. Amsterdam: Elsevier.
- Mibey, R.K. & Kokwaro, J.O. (1998). "Meliola icacinacearum and M. kerichoensis, spp. nov. from Kenya". Mycological Research 102 (11): 1418–1420.
- Mibey, R.K. & Cannon, P.F. (1999). "Biotrophic fungi from Kenya: ten new species and some new records of Meliolaceae". Cryptogamie, Mycologie 20 (4): 249–282.
- Cannon, P.F.; Mibey, R.K. & Siboe, G.M. (2001). "Microfungi and the conservation agenda in Kenya". In Moore, D.; Nauta, M.M.; Evans, S.E. & Rotheroe, M. (eds). Fungal Conservation. Cambridge: Cambridge University Press.
- Wachira, P.; Mibey, R.K.; Okoth, S.; Kimenju, J. & Kiarie, J. (2009). "Diversity of nematode destroying fungi in Taita Taveta, Kenya". Fungal Ecology 2 (2): 60–65.
- Musieba, F.; Okoth, S.; Mibey, R.K.; Wanjiku, S. & Moraa, K. (2013). "Proximate composition, amino acids and vitamins profile of Pleurotus citrinopileatus Singer: an indigenous mushroom in Kenya". American Journal of Food Technology.
