= Faramerz Dabhoiwala =

American historian and research scholar

Fara Dabhoiwala
- Born: Faramerz Noshir Dabhoiwala; 1969 (age 56–57)
- Occupations: Senior Research Scholar & Lecturer with rank of Professor, Princeton
- Spouse: Jo Dunkley
- Children: 4

Academic background
- Education: University of York (BA); University of Oxford (DPhil)
- Thesis: Prostitution and police in London, c. 1660 - c. 1760 (1995)

Academic work
- Institutions: Princeton University; University of Oxford
- Notable works: The Origins of Sex: A History of the First Sexual Revolution
- Website: dabhoiwala.com

Faramerz Noshir Dabhoiwala (born 1969) is an Indian-born American historian and senior research scholar at Princeton University, New Jersey, United States, where he teaches and writes about the social, cultural, and intellectual history, from the Middle Ages to the present day, of the English-speaking world.

== Early life and education ==
Dabhoiwala was born in England to Indian parents. His surgeon father later moved the family to Amsterdam, Netherlands, where Fara grew up, feeling partly Dutch but also "rooted in [his] Indian heritage," while speaking English at home. After studying in Amsterdam, he received his bachelor's degree from the University of York, before attending the University of Oxford, where, in 1995, he received his PhD in History. His dissertation was on prostitution in 17th- and 18th-century London. In 1996, his article on the construction of social status in England during the same period was published.

== Career ==
Before moving to Princeton University in 2016, Dabhoiwala was the Senior Germaine Scholar at Brasenose College, University of Oxford (1992–1994) and a Post-Doctoral Research Fellow at All Souls College (1996–1998). He was the Official Fellow and Lecturer in Modern History at Exeter College, Oxford from 1998 until 2016, where he remains an Emeritus Fellow.

== Author ==
=== The Origins of Sex ===
His 2012 book, The Origins of Sex: A History of the First Sexual Revolution, examines the ostensible "first" sexual revolution and reviews the history of human sexuality. It was listed by The Economist among the Books of the Year, and lauded by numerous reviewers. The Sunday Telegraph's Noel Malcolm found it "marvellously rich" and "thought-provoking," its text drawing on a "huge" range of materials. In The Times, Ian Kelly felt that "the depth of detailed historical research" found in Sex makes it a "timely and important work," while historian Dominic Sandbrook, in the Sunday Times, assessed the work, which, he noted, places the time of the sexual revolution not in the 1960s but during the 17th and 18th centuries, as "lucidly written, densely researched and thoroughly persuasive."

Feminist author and historian Germaine Greer, in her Observer review, found Dabhoiwala's numerous sources to provide no more than "modish theoretical discussions" of the topics "[he] chooses to address," while he does not test the work's basic assumptions against actual behaviour. She finds the author's contention that "since the dawn of English civilisation the courts and the church had enforced the principle that illicit sex should not be tolerated by the community" to be "simply not true;" condemnations of fornication can be found in every epoch, she argues, but while their relation to actual practice is "virtually impossible to establish," Dabhoiwala treats such rules as evidence of actual suppression. "Obscenity has been an essential tool of political satire at least since Juvenal," she concludes.

University of Maryland's Laura J. Rosenthal found the material invoked in the book to already be familiar and not neglected by scholarship, acknowledging, though, that the author presents it in a "lively" and "fascinating" way. She questions whether the author claims a sexual revolution occurred "in practice, in law, in attitude, or in discourse," since the book, as she states, contains little evidence about that. Dabhoiwala, she asserts, bases his argument for a sexual revolution in that time frame on novels, testimonies by prostitutes, histories of scandals, and "pamphlet wars over sexual topics;" but, although his work documents the "explosion" of publications with sexual content, he, ultimately, does not demonstrate that "sexual practice changed."

=== What Is Free Speech? ===
His second book, What is Free Speech? The History of a Dangerous Idea was published in 2025. Dabhoiwala argues that the right way to determine what kind of speech should be "tolerated" is to abandon the distinction, which he finds "dubious," between actions and words," and that, therefore, it should be acceptable to oppose and even legislate against speech that "you" believe to be "seriously harmful."

Danish lawyer and free-speech advocate Jacob Mchangama claims that Dabhoiwala's understanding of free speech, as ostensibly shown in the book, is "historically flawed," while "the cure he prescribes is worse than the disease," as he confuses the "symptoms with the underlying cause." In his expanded review for Foreign Affairs, Mchangama argues that Dabhoiwala portrays free speech primarily as a tool of the powerful, while history proves that this freedom has consistently been an "engine of emancipation" for the marginal sectors of society; free speech offers to those without social power a "peaceful way to challenge authority."

The Critic review welcomes the book's "pithy" genealogy of the subject of free speech with its strongly argued positions, though extraordinarily partial, such as that free speech absolutism is a relatively recent norm born from American libertarianism. However, the book is found to embody the failure and blindness of the "English-speaking academy" to deal with political reality and the academy's own failures, to the extent that it often descends to "unintentional self-parody." Modern cancel-culture is, for the book's author, the review states, simply a demonstration of "the growing power and voice of previously marginalized groups," but conservatives' demands for freedom on the basis of, for example, religious identity, are dismissed as “making 'religious liberty' an excuse for discriminatory speech." For the reviewer, the work confirms the worst assumptions of academia's critics, in that they are arrogantly contemptuous and patronizing of the "incorrigibly ignorant masses."

In his New Yorker review, Louis Menand objected to the author's "judgy" dismissal of the notion of free speech as an "inherently unstable fiction" and "a contrived, invented concept," pointing out that all societal concepts have been, by definition, invented by humans, as tools meant to assist people in "dealing with the world." Menand agrees with the author's position that free-speech rights, "like all rights, really," reflect and could help perpetuate "existing power relations," but disagrees with the claim that this diminishes the merit of these rights. Dabhoiwala finds the "maximalist character" of free-speech legislation and case law in the States as its "worst" aspect, Menand states, comparing that position and agreeing with the one ostensibly taken by Princeton president Christopher L. Eisgruber who, in his 2025 book Terms of Respect, finds it's the best thing about it, arguing for "more speech" in dialogue, instead of censorship.

== Personal life ==
Dabhoiwala is a Parsi. He lives with his partner, Princeton professor and astrophysicist Jo Dunkley, in Oxford, with their two daughters, as well as his two daughters from a previous relationship.

== Publications ==
=== Articles ===
- Dabhoiwala, Fara (21 November 2024). "A Man of Parts and Learning". London Review of Books. 46 (22): 1858–1866. doi:10.1016/j.enpol.2007.05.021.
- Fara Dabhoiwala, "Imperial Delusions" (review of Priya Satia, Time's Monster: How History Makes History, Belknap Press/Harvard University Press, 2020, 363 pp.; Mahmood Mamdani, Neither Settler nor Native: The Making and Unmaking of Permanent Minorities, Belknap Press/Harvard University Press, 2020, 401 pp.; and Adom Getachew, Worldmaking after Empire: The Rise and Fall of Self-Determination, Princeton University Press, 2019, 271 pp.), The New York Review of Books, vol. LXVIII, no. 11, 1 July 2021, pp. 59–62

== See also ==
- Sexual revolution, on the social movement that challenged traditional codes of behavior related to sexuality and interpersonal relationships throughout the Western world during the 20th century and particularly from the late 1950s to the early 1970s
- New York Times Co. v. Sullivan, landmark U.S. Supreme Court decision that ruled that the freedom of speech protections in the First Amendment to the U.S. Constitution limit the ability of a public official to sue for defamation
