= Godwin Murunga =

Kenyan scholar and political analyst

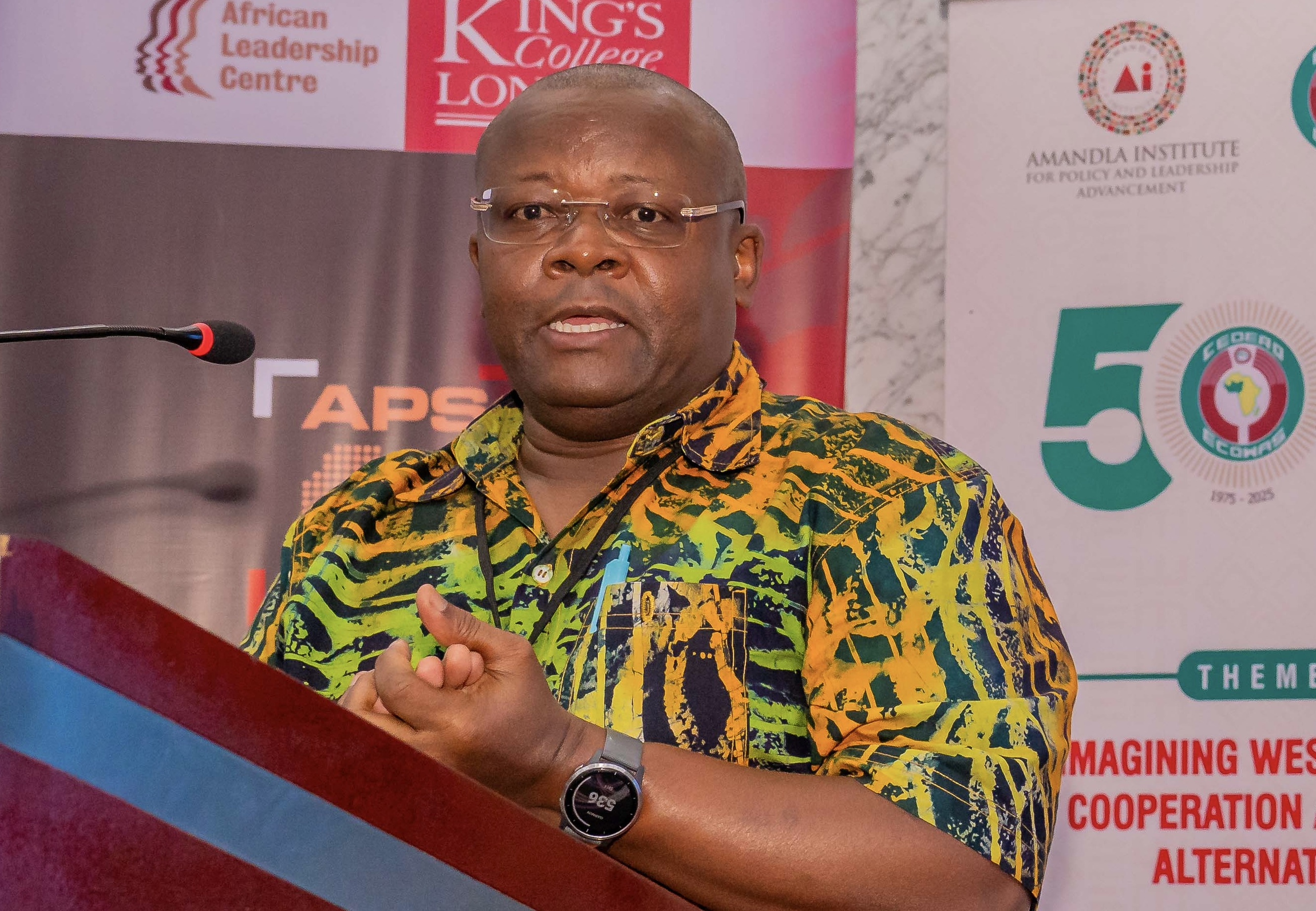
- Murunga in 2025 at the ECOWAS 50th Anniversary, Abuja
- Born: Kenya
- Other name: Godwin Rapando Murunga
- Citizenship: Kenyan
- Education: Kenyatta University (BA), (MA) Northwestern University (MA), (PhD)
- Occupations: Historian; Public intellectual; Political analyst

Godwin Murunga is a Kenyan historian, political analyst, and public intellectual whose work focuses on higher education in Africa. He served as the Executive Secretary of the Council for the Development of Social Science Research in Africa (CODESRIA), a pan-African social science research organisation headquartered in Dakar, Senegal from 2017 to 2026.

== Education ==
Murunga earned a Bachelor of Arts and Master of Arts from Kenyatta University, and a second MA and a PhD in history at Northwestern University in Evanston, Illinois.

== Career ==
Before his appointment as Executive Secretary of CODESRIA, Murunga held a range of academic, research, and leadership roles across institutions. He taught in the Department of History, Archaeology and Political Studies at Kenyatta University in Nairobi. He lectured at the Institute of Development Studies of the University of Nairobi and served as director of the African Leadership Centre, Nairobi. He was a member of the Executive Committee of CODESRIA for two consecutive terms (2005–2011), before his appointment as the 7th Executive Secretary of CODESRIA, where he served from 2017 to 2026.

Murunga contributes to Kenya's Daily Nation, writing on governance, security, democracy, and regional politics. He has written an opinion piece for CNN on African politics and security issues. His interviews and commentary have also been featured on platforms including Africa Uncensored and The Elephant, particularly during the COVID-19 pandemic.

== Selected publications ==
- Murunga, Godwin R., Ibrahim O. Ogachi, and Jimi Adesina. “Reflections on Social Policy in Africa.” CODESRIA Bulletin, no. 6 (2021): 2.
- Murunga, Godwin R., Ato Kwamena Onoma, and Ibrahim Oanda Ogachi. “CODESRIA’s Meaning-making Research Initiatives (MRI).” Africa Development / Afrique et Développement 45, no. 4 (2020): v–x.
- Murunga, Godwin R. “Moments of anxiety and fear: The Kenyan post-election violence, 2007–2008.” In Kenya after 50: Reconfiguring the Future, edited by Kimani Njogu and John W. Harbeson. Nairobi: Twaweza Communications, 2014.
- Murunga, Godwin R., and Shadrack W. Nasong’o (eds.). Kenya: The Struggle for Democracy. Dakar: Council for the Development of Social Science Research in Africa (CODESRIA), 2007.ISBN 978-1842778579
- Murunga, Godwin R. “The state, civil society and democracy in Kenya.” Review of African Political Economy 36, no. 122 (2009): 156–157.
- Murunga, Godwin R. Spokes of the Wheel: Ethnicity and the Politics of Nationalism in Kenya. Dakar: Council for the Development of Social Science Research in Africa (CODESRIA), 1999.

== See also ==
- CODESRIA
- Pan-Africanism
- Isabel Casimiro
- Zubairu Wai
