= Council for the Development of Social Science Research in Africa =

Pan-African research organisation

CODESRIA
- Conseil pour le développement de la recherche en sciences sociales en Afrique
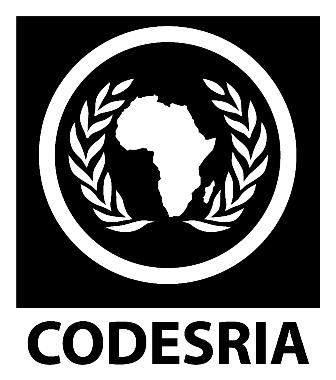
- Website: http://www.codesria.org

The Council for the Development of Social Science Research in Africa (CODESRIA, French: Conseil pour le développement de la recherche en sciences sociales en Afrique) is a Pan-African research organisation headquartered in Dakar, Senegal. Lyn Ossome currently serves as the President of CODESRIA with Zubairu Wai recently appointed as the 8th Executive Secretary of the Council.

== Background ==
CODESRIA was established in 1973. Its aim is to promote, facilitate and disseminate research (within the social sciences) throughout Africa and also to create a community in which members can work without barriers regarding language, country, age or gender. While CODESRIA is an active research organization it does not abstain from serving as a platform for political statements. Unlike many other organizations it does not agree with the traditional division of Africa in the social sciences where North Africa is often more or less left out, instead, it tries to equally represent the 5 regions in Africa (North Africa, East Africa, Central Africa, West Africa and South Africa).

To achieve their mission, CODESRIA cooperates with African institutes (e.g.: ERNWACA, FSS) and non-African institutes and organizations (e.g.: the ASC and the NAI). Funding is obtained through various donors ranging from the Dutch and Danish Foreign Ministries, the Senegalese Government, the Ford Foundation to the United Nations. In 1997 the organisation received one of the Prince Claus Awards. CODESRIA has three governing organs, the General Assembly being the highest, followed by the Executive Committee (headed by Sam Moyo) and the Scientific Committee (headed by Takyiwaa Manuh), each with their own specific roles.

== Contributions to Social Sciences ==
CODESRIA grants scholarships. These grants comprise all levels from Master's degree to post-doctoral research, organizes conferences and programs focusing on issues related to the social sciences and humanities, publishes in various forms (also see publications) and helps in setting up research training. The CODESRIA College of Mentors, a Pan-African initiative aimed at strengthening research capacity in African universities, has featured mentors such as Abdul Karim Bangura, Mshai Mwangola, Josephine Ahikire, Amy Niang, and Laban Ayiro.

== Leadership ==
Since its establishment, CODESRIA has been led by Presidents and Executive Secretaries drawn from across Africa’s social science communities.

No.	President	Term of office
1	Jacques Kazadi Nduba Wa Dile	1973–1976
2	Kankam Twum-Barima	1976–1979
3	Justinian F. Rweyemamu	1979–1981
4	Jacob Mumbi Mwanza	1982–1985
5	Claude Ake	1986–1989
6	Taladidia Thiombiano	1989–1992
7	Ernest Wamba-Dia-Wamba	1992–1995
8	Akilagpa Sawyerr	1995–1998
9	Mahmood Mamdani	1998–2002
10	Zenebeworke Tadesse	2003–2005
11	Teresa Cruz e Silva	2005–2008
12	Sam Moyo	2008–2011
13	Fatima Harrak	2011–2015
14	Dzodzi Tsikata	2015–2018
15	Isabel Maria Casimiro	2018–2023
16	Lyn Ossome	2023–

No.	Executive Secretary	Term of office
1	Samir Amin	1973–1975
2	Abdalla Bujra	1975–1985
3	Thandika Mkandawire	1985–1996
4	Achille Mbembe	1996–2000
5	Adebayo Olukoshi	2001–2009
6	Ebrima Sall	2009–2017
7	Godwin Murunga	2017–2026
8	Zubairu Wai	2026–

== Publications ==
No.	Journals	Notes
1	Africa Development	Is the quarterly bilingual journal of CODESRIA published since 1976
2	African Sociological Review	
3	African Journal of International Affairs	A bi-annual, peer-reviewed academic journal by CODESRIA covering contemporary African international affairs (ISSN 0850-7902).
4	Afrika Zamani	
5	Identity, Culture and Politics: an Afro-Asian Dialogue	
6	CODESRIA Bulletin	Quarterly CODESRIA publication for social science discussion and research cooperation ISSN 0850-8712.
7	Journal of Higher Education in Africa	
8	Africa Review of Books (started 2005, ISSN 0851-7592)	The ARB (Revue Africaine de Livres) is published twice yearly in English and in French. It is piloted by both the Forum for Social Studies (FSS), and the National centre of research in social and cultural anthropology (CRASC).
9	Africa Media Review	
10	Afro-Arab Selections for Social Sciences	

No.	Online Publications	Notes
1	Africa Development	
2	African Sociological Review	A bi-annual, peer-reviewed sociology journal published by CODESRIA, welcoming scholarly articles in English and French
3	Afrika Zamani	
4	Identity, Culture and Politics : an Afro-Asian Dialogue	
5	Monographs on line	A research monograph series published by CODESRIA to disseminate original social science research and stimulate scholarly debate.
