= Josephine Ahikire =

Ugandan academic and feminist scholar

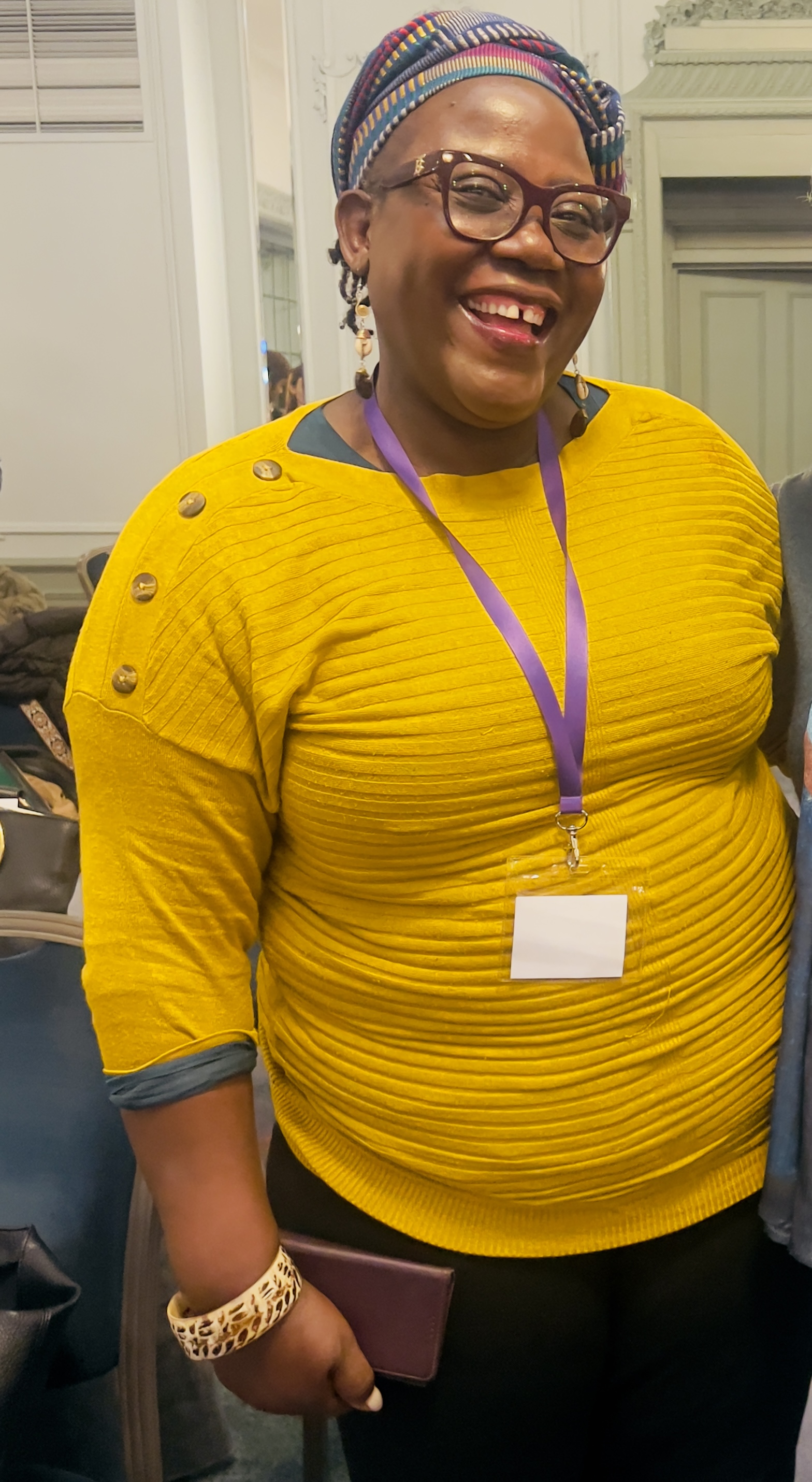
- Born: Josephine Ahikire
- Occupations: Academic, Researcher, African Feminist
- Known for: Feminist scholarship; Gender and politics research; Leadership at Makerere University
- Title: Professor of Gender Studies
- Predecessor: As Principal of CHUSS: Josephine Ahikire
- Successor: As Principal of CHUSS: Helen Nkabala (2024)

Academic background
- Education: St. Joseph’s Primary School (completed 1979); Advanced Level (1986); Bachelor of Social Sciences, Makerere University (1987–); PhD
- Alma mater: Makerere University (BA, MA); PhD (institution not specified)

Academic work
- Discipline: Gender Studies, Feminist Theory, Politics, Cultural Studies
- Institutions: Makerere University – School of Women and Gender Studies / Institute of Gender and Development Studies; Centre for Basic Research (CBR), Kampala
- Notable works: Controlling Consent: Uganda’s 2016 Elections (co‑editor); Key publications on gender equity, domestic violence policy, African feminism

Josephine Ahikire is a Ugandan academic, researcher and African feminist. She is the professor, and the former Dean at the School of Women and Gender Studies, Makerere University. She served as the Principal at the College of Humanities and Social Sciences, Makerere University.

== Background and education ==
She attended her primary education at St Joseph's Primary School and completed it in 1979. She completed her Advanced level in 1986 before joining Makerere University in 1987 to pursue a degree in Social Sciences. She holds a PhD.

== Career ==
She previously served as the associate professor at the Institute of Gender and Development Studies formerly known as the School of Women and Gender Studies, Makerere University before becoming the Professor. She served as the Acting Deputy Principal, College of Humanities and Social Sciences before becoming the Principal at the College of Humanities and Social Sciences, Makerere University, a role she held until May 2024. In 2024, she was succeeded by Helen Nkabala as the Principal of the school on the 31st May 2024.

Josephine has been a visiting professor through Universities internationally including being a member of Senate, the University Academic Organ since 2015. Josephine has been teaching for the past two decades in the field of feminist theory, gender and politics, livelihood and cultural studies. She served as the chair of the Gender theme for the African Studies Association 2015 (USA), also served as the Dean at School of Women and Gender Studies.

She is currently a senior lecturer at the Institute of Gender and Development Studies. She is also the Executive Chair of the Centre for Basic Research (CBR) in Kampala, a member of the National Governance Council for the African Peer Review Mechanism (APRM) and a board member of the Uganda National NGO Forum.

== Academic Honorary appointment ==
She is an Honorary Professor at the Centre for Advancement of Non racialism and Democracy (CANRAD) Nelson Mandela University, South Africa. This followed an appointment by professor A Govindjee, the Acting Deputy Vice Chancellor Research, Innovation and Internationalization at the Nelson Mandela University on February 1, 2020. The Honorary Professor appointment title also recognises the level of distinction commensurate with the status of a Professor and is conferred on persons with an associative relationship with the university. Her appointment was a recognition of her intellectual and scholarly accomplishments in the development and application of knowledge that has a transformative impact on society.

== Publications and books ==
- Ahikire, J. and A. A. Mwiine (2020). ‘Gender equitable change and the place of informal networks in Uganda’s legislative policy reforms‘, ESID Working Paper No. 134, Manchester.
- Ahikire, J. and A. A. Mwiine (2015). ‘The politics of promoting gender equity in contemporary Uganda: Cases of the Domestic Violence Law and the policy on Universal Primary Education‘, ESID Working Paper No. 55. Manchester.
- ESID blog, 25 November 2015: ‘Why is domestic violence legislation falling short in Uganda?‘ by J. Ahikire and A. A. Mwiine.
- Contesting Ideas, aligning incentives: The politics of Uganda’s Domestic Violence Act (2010)’ in S. Nazneen, S. Hickey & E. Sifaki (eds.) Negotiating Gender Equity in the Global South: The Politics of Domestic Violence Policy Routledge, London and New York, 2019.
- ‘On the Shifting Gender of the State in Africa: reflections from Ugandas Experience’, Politeia vol. 37 no. 2, 2018
- ‘“Please Daddy Give us Some More”: Recognition Politics and the Language of Special Interest Groups’, in J. Oloka Onyango and J. Ahikire (eds.) Controlling Consent: Uganda’s 2016 Elections, Trenton: Africa World Press, 2017.
- The report: ‘Women shattering the glass ceiling: Experiences from the 2016 elections in Uganda’.
- ‘Cutting the Coat according to the Cloth: Examining Women’s Agency on Land Rights in Rural Uganda’ in Kyomuhendo Bantebya, G. Ahikire J. S. Gerrard and Muhanguzi, K.F. (eds.) Gender Poverty and Social Transformation: Reflections on Fractures and Continuities in Contemporary Uganda, Kampala: Fountain Publishers. 2014.
- Controlling Consent: Uganda’s 2016 election. African World Press, 2016, co-edited with J. Oloka-Onyango.
- The politics of promoting gender equity in contemporary Uganda: Cases of the Domestic Violence Law and the policy on Universal Primary Education. ESID Working Paper No. 55, November 2015, with Amon A. Mwiine.
- African feminism in context: Reflections on the legitimation battles, victories and reversals, Feminist Africa, 2014 (19): 7-23.
- “Scandalous!! The book – ‘Controlling Consent’ on Uganda's 2016 elections – has been seized,”
- Localised or Localising Democracy: Gender and the Politics of Decentralisation in Contemporary Uganda.

== See also ==
- Joe Oloka-Onyango
- Laban Ayiro
- Council for the Development of Social Science Research in Africa
- Charter of Feminist Principles for African Feminists
- Joy Kwesiga
- African feminism
- Sylvia Tamale
- Amon Ashaba Mwiine
