= Dzodzi Tsikata =

Ghanaian academic

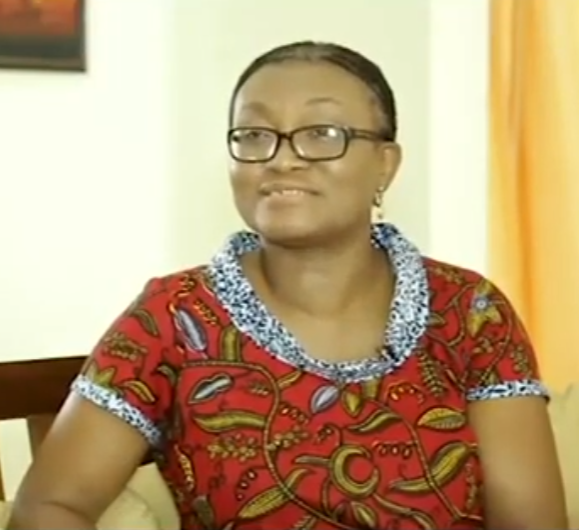
- In an IIED video in 2019
- Occupation: Academic
- Employer: University of Ghana

Dzodzi Tsikata is a Ghanaian feminist, academic, professor of Development Sociology and Director of Institute of African Studies (IAS) at the University of Ghana.

== Biography ==
Dzodzi Tsikata is a professor at the Institute of Statistical Social and Economic Research at the University of Ghana. Her academic interests include gender and development Issues, gender equity policies and practices. She was elected in June 2015 as the president of Council for the Development of Social Science Research in Africa (CODESRIA) at their 14th general assembly meeting in Senegal.

Her research interests have also included the exploitation of local contract farmers by large corporate plantations that are often characterized as having "few linkages" into the economies of the countries that they operate in. Along with researchers from the University of Sussex and University of the Western Cape, Dzodzi Tsikata received funding from the Economic and Social Sciences Research Council to investigate the pros and cons of commercial farming models in Africa.

Since August 2016, she has been the director of the Institute of African studies at the University of Ghana. She is an advocate against early marriages in Ghanaian communities, which currently sees a fourth of girls getting married before they turn eighteen years old.
