= Isabel Casimiro =

Mozambican sociologist

Isabel Maria Cortesão Casimiro
- Born: 14 January 1955 (age 70); Iapala, Nampula Province, Mozambique
- Citizenship: Mozambican
- Occupations: Sociologist, Women's Rights Activist, Politician
- Title: Professor

Academic background
- Education: PhD
- Alma mater: University of Coimbra

Isabel Maria Cortesão Casimiro (born 14 January 1955) is a Mozambican sociologist, feminist, women's rights activist, and a former politician. She is a professor at the Centre of African Studies, Eduardo Mondlane University in Maputo, Mozambique.

She is the founder of Fórum Mulher and Women and Law in Southern Africa Research and Education Trust. She was a FRELIMO Member of Parliament from 1995 to 1999.

Casimiro served as the President of the Council for the Development of Social Science Research in Africa (CODESRIA) from 2018 to 2023.

== Early life ==
Isabel Maria Casimiro was born on 14 January 1955 in Iapala, a small village in Nampula Province, on the north-east coast of Mozambique. Her father was a medical doctor based at the railway station in Iapala. Her parents had moved to Mozambique in 1952, because they were members of the Portuguese Communist Party, which had been declared illegal by the government, so they were effectively "exiled" to what was then one of Portugal's overseas colonies.

Casimiro earned a doctorate in sociology from the University of Coimbra in Portugal, with additional academic training in history and development studies.

== Career ==
=== Political career ===
From 1995 to 1999 Casimiro was a Member of Parliament, representing FRELIMO, the Mozambique Liberation Front.

=== Academic career ===
Since 1980, Casimiro has been a researcher and sociology professor in the Centre of African Studies at Eduardo Mondlane University in Maputo, where she specialises in women's and human rights, feminist movements, development issues, and participatory democracy. She coordinates the Department of Development and Gender Studies.

Academic analyses have positioned her as a leading voice in Mozambican gender studies and described her as one of the pioneering figures alongside Ana Loforte shaping feminist scholarship and the study of gender relations in Mozambique.

=== Activism and leadership ===
Casimiro is a founder of the Women and Law in Southern Africa Research and Education Trust (WLSA), serving as its first national coordinator from 1990 to 1995 and later as WLSA Mozambique Board President since 2015. She also co-founded the Fórum Mulher, serving as its president from 2006 to 2015.

Casimiro also served as the President of the Council for the Development of Social Science Research in Africa (CODESRIA), a pan-African social science research organisation headquartered in Dakar, Senegal from 2018-2023.

== Selected publications ==
- Casimiro, Isabel Maria Cortesão, and Catarina Casimiro Trindade. "Mozambican Feminisms: Between the Local and the Global." In Transnational Feminist Itineraries: Situating Theory and Activist Practice, edited by Ashwini Tambe and Millie Thayer. Durham: Duke University Press, 2021.ISBN 9781478014430
- A Ciência ao Serviço do Desenvolvimento? Experiências de países africanos falantes de língua oficial portuguesa (2015), edited with Teresa Cruz e Silva.ISBN 9782869786097
- Casimiro, Isabel Maria Cortesão. "Peace on Earth, War at Home": Feminism and Women's Organizations in Mozambique. Maputo: PROMEDIA, 2004; republished Recife, Brazil: Universidade Federal de Pernambuco, 2014.
- Casimiro, Isabel Maria Cortesão, Amélia Neves de Souto, Josina Nhantumbo, and Augusta Maíta. Women's Economic Empowerment, Associative Movement and Access to Local Development Funds. Maputo: Kapicua, 2010.
- Tripp, Aili Mari; Casimiro, Isabel; Kwesiga, Joy; Mungwa, Alice (2009). African Women's Movements: Changing Political Landscapes. Cambridge: Cambridge University Press.ISBN 9780511800351

== See also ==
- CODESRIA
- Pan-Africanism
- Godwin Murunga
