= Yotaro Kobayashi =

Japanese businessman

Yotaro Kobayashi (小林陽太郎, Kobayashi Yotaro; 25 April 1933 – 5 September 2015) was a British-born Japanese executive who was chairman of the Fuji Xerox company, a joint venture between Fujifilm (75%) and Xerox (25%). He served as Pacific Asia chairman of the Trilateral Commission.

== Early life ==
He was educated at Keio University and the Wharton School of the University of Pennsylvania, graduating in 1956 and 1958, respectively.

== Career ==
His father, Setsutaro Kobayashi, was the third president of Fujifilm and the first president of the Fuji Xerox company. He was chair of the board of the International University of Japan, succeeding founder Sohei Nakayama, formerly of the Industrial Bank of Japan. He was the President of Aspen Japan.

== Politics and firebomb attack ==
In September 2004, Kobayashi, who was the Chief Japanese committee member of the First China–Japan Friendship 21st Century Committee, criticized Japanese prime minister Junichirō Koizumi over his repeated visits to the Yasukuni Shrine, which had caused anger in the People's Republic of China as well as in Korea. Subsequently, Molotov cocktails were thrown into the grounds of Kobayashi's home in Meguro, Tokyo, an act police suspect was carried out by nationalist groups who are hostile to his views.

== Death ==
He died of chronic empyema in Tokyo on 5 September 2015.
