= Africa Development =

- Discipline: African studies
- Language: English; French

Publication details
- History: 1976–present
- Publisher: CODESRIA (Senegal)
- Frequency: Quarterly

Standard abbreviations
- ISO 4: Afr. Dev.

Indexing
- ISSN: 0850-3907

Links
- Journal homepage

Africa Development (Afrique et développement) is the quarterly bilingual journal of CODESRIA published since 1976. It is a social science journal whose major focus is on issues which are central to the development of society. Its principal objective is to provide a forum for the exchange of ideas among African scholars from a variety of intellectual persuasions and various disciplines. The journal also encourages other contributors working on Africa or those undertaking comparative analysis of developing world issues.

== Indexing information ==
The journal is indexed in International Bibliography of the Social Sciences, International African Bibliography, African Studies Abstracts, and Abstracts on Rural Development in the Tropics.
