= International University of Japan =

Private university in Minamiuonuma, Niigata Prefecture, Japan

International University of Japan (IUJ)
- 国際大学
- Motto: Where the World Gathers
- Type: Private
- Established: 1982
- Chairman: Fumia Kokubu
- President: Takeo Kikkawa
- Students: 374 (graduate)
- Location: Minamiuonuma, Niigata, Japan; 37°08′53.72″N 138°56′50.61″E
- Alumni: 5,193 (from 143 countries)
- Colors: blue
- Website: www.iuj.ac.jp

The International University of Japan (国際大学, Kokusai Daigaku), abbreviated IUJ, is a private university located in Minamiuonuma, Niigata, Japan.

Established in 1982, IUJ is Japan’s first graduate university offering only graduate programs, and one of the few that conducts all courses in English. It was founded in 1982. It offers Master's degrees in International Development, Economics, Public Management, and International Relations, as well as an MBA. The Digital Transformation Program began in 2021, followed by the International Public Policy Program in 2022. IUJ is accredited by the Ministry of Education, Japan, and its Graduate School of International Management earned AACSB accreditation in 2018.

Each year, IUJ welcomes students from more than 50 countries, maintaining a close-knit community of around 310 students. Its diversity was highlighted during the university’s 25th anniversary with a Guinness World Record attempt for "the most nationalities in a sauna (50)".

== History ==
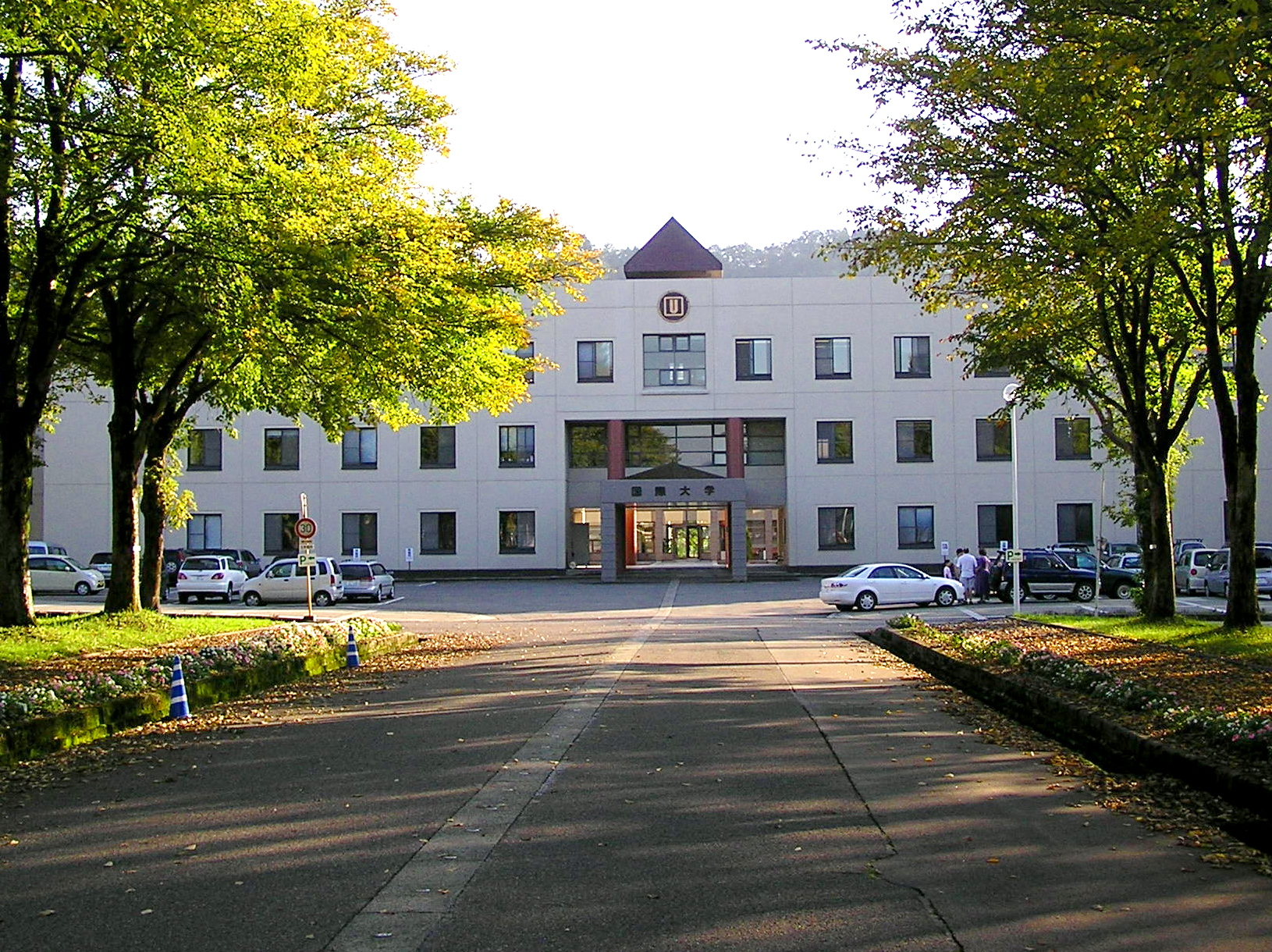
The tree-lined main entrance and facade of IUJ

IUJ was founded in 1982 by representatives of business, government and world organizations. It was established with extensive support from Japan's industrial, financial and educational communities as well as from the local community.

IUJ is Japan's first graduate-school-only university and the first to use English-medium education (EMI) in the classroom.

The Graduate School of International Relations (GSIR) was the first school at IUJ. Leading supporters IUJ's foundation included the Japan Association of Corporate Executives, Japan Federation of Economic Organizations, Industrial Bank of Japan, Japan Chamber of Commerce and Industry, and Japan Foreign Trade Council.

In 1988, the Graduate School of International Management (GSIM) was established in collaboration with the Amos Tuck School of Business at Dartmouth College, United States, as the first US-style business school in Japan, and the first MBA to teach only in English. In that same year, the Matsushita Library & Information Center (MLIC) was established with an endowment from the Matsushita International Foundation, now called the Kinoshita Matsushita Memorial Foundation (KMMF).

== Structure ==
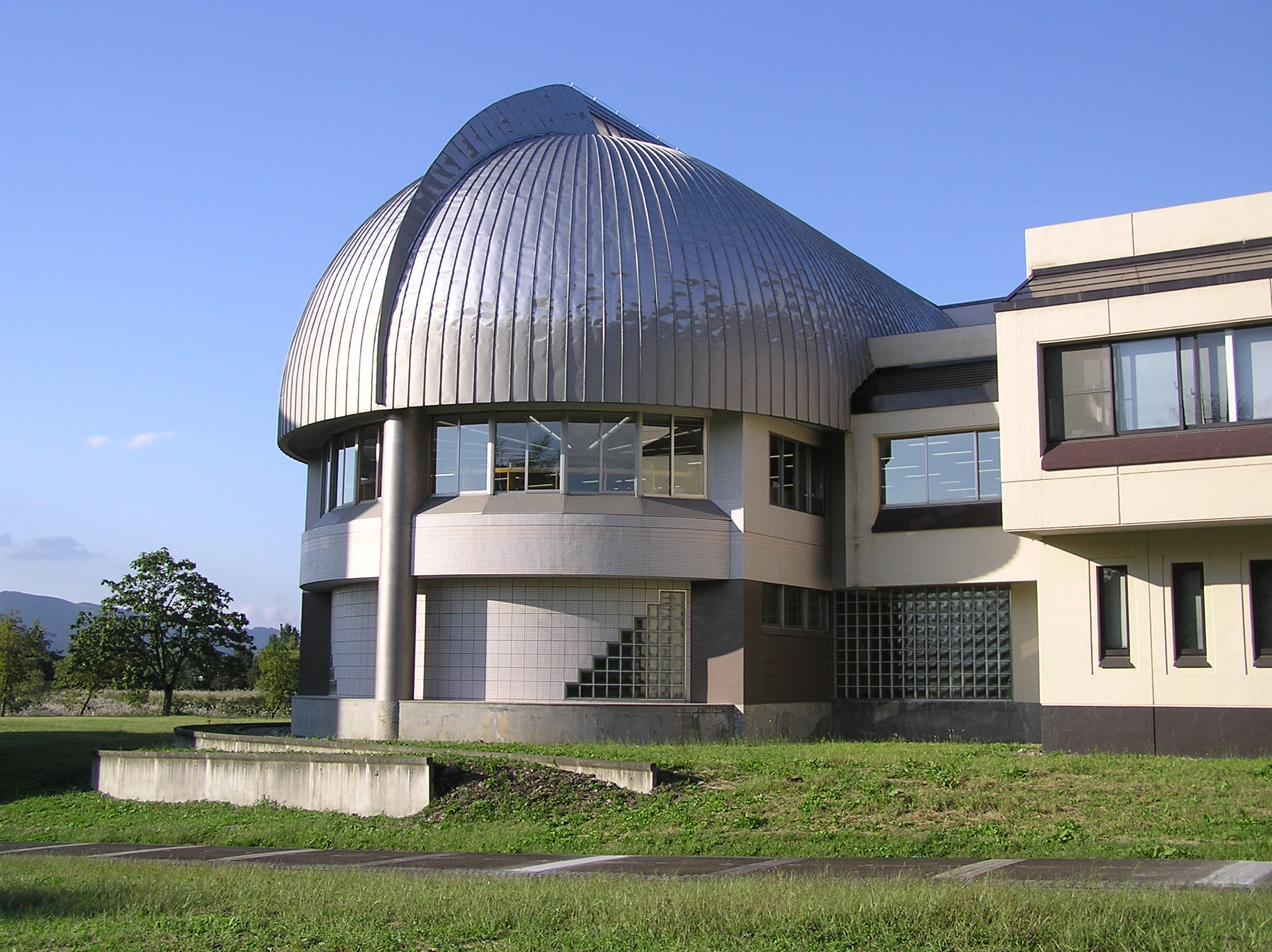
The Matsushita Library and Information Center

IUJ comprises two graduate schools: the Graduate School of International Relations (GSIR) and the Graduate School of International Management (GSIM). Both schools offer Master's degree programs, the GSIR offers PhD degree programs.

The university runs two research institutes: The IUJ Research Institute based on campus and The Center for Global Communications (GLOCOM) located in Tokyo. GLOCOM was established in spring of 1991 as a social science institute specializing in the study of information society and Japan. GLOCOM's research focuses on the social, economic and cultural impacts of new communications technologies.

== Academic programs ==
=== Degree programs ===
IUJ offers Master's degree programs and a PhD degree program.

The Graduate School of International Management (GSIM) offers four graduate programs: a full-time 2-year MBA program, a 1-year MBA program targeted at company sponsored students with over 5 years of experience, a Japan-Global Development Program, and the Digital Transformation Program. The Business School's working Motto is "Leveraging Emerging Asia for Global Advantage."

The Graduate School of International Relations (GSIR) offers three graduate programs and 5 master's degrees: International Relations Program (IRP) offering an MA in international relations and MA in political science, the International Development Program (IDP) offering an MA in International Development and an MA in economics, Public Management and Policy Analysis Program (PMPP) offering an MA in public management and an MA in International Public Policy (IPPP), Japan-Global Development Program (JGDP) offering an MBA in International Relations/Economics/International Development/ Public Management, the International Public Policy Program offers a Master in International Public Policy.

Since cross-registration is encouraged, students may select 'elective' courses from other programs to customize their graduate degree program for their individual professional goals.

All courses require a thesis, with a very few exceptions that allow a research report, as part of the degree requirements.

=== Language programs ===
IUJ offers two optional language programs, one in English and the other in Japanese.

The English language courses are designed for non-native English speakers who wish to develop their proficiency to the level required to participate fully in the English-medium environment of IUJ. IUJ offers various English program, it includes an Intensive English Program (IEP) held in the summer and academic English courses that mostly for students to prepare their thesis writing and it held throughout the academic year.

The Japanese Language Program (JLP) offers non-native Japanese speakers the opportunity to learn the Japanese language at four different proficiency levels, from Basic to Advanced.

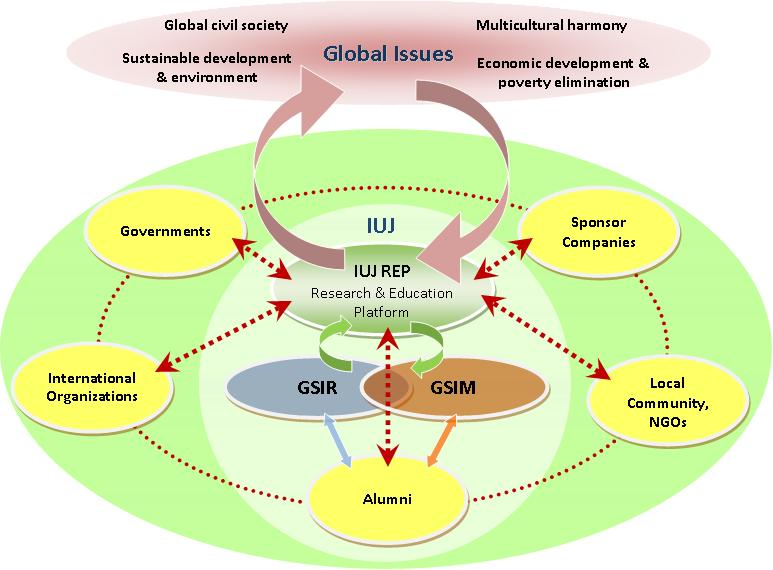
Flowchart of the IUJ Research & Education platform

=== Ties to Corporate Japan ===
Its Global Partnership program puts IUJ in formal relationships with over 50 companies in Japan spanning banking, consulting, trade and logistics firms. These companies, and more, take advantage of IUJ's Non-degree programs, such as the Executive Degree program, the Global Leaders program, and the 8-week Intensive English Program.

== Exchange programs ==
IUJ has established student exchange programs with more than 50 institutions across Asia, Europe, and North America. The purpose is to give students various opportunities to learn in different educational environments and to broaden their horizons. Up to ten credits earned at the host institution could be transferred to IUJ with no extra tuition paid to the host institution.

Updated lists of the GSIR and GSIM partner schools at the respective school websites.

The following are GSIR's students exchange partners:

1. Norman Paterson School of International Affairs, Carleton University (Canada)
2. Faculty of Social Sciences - Charles (Czech)
3. Bocconi University (Italy)
4. Blanquerna School of Communication and International Relations-Ramon Llull (Spain)
5. School of International Trade and Economics -UIBE (China)
6. Graduate School of International Studies - SNU (Korea)
7. Graduate School of International Studies -Yonsei (Korea)
8. Graduate School of International Studies -Ewha (Korea)
9. Thammasat University (Thailand)
10. College of Social Sciences NCCU(Taiwan)

The following are GSIM's students exchange partners:

1. Tuck School of Business, Dartmouth College (USA)
2. Kenan-Flagler Business School - UNC (USA)
3. Owen Graduate School of Management - Vanderbilt (USA)
4. Simon Business School - Rochester (USA)
5. Warrington College of Business Administration -UF (USA)
6. John Molson School of Business -Concordia (Canada)
7. Schulich School of Business - York (Canada)
8. Warwick Business School, University of Warwick (United Kingdom)
9. Aalto University (Finland)
10. SDA Bocconi School of Management (Italy)
11. EMLYON Business School (France)
12. NEOMA Business School (France)
13. University of St. Gallen (Switzerland)
14. WHU – Otto Beisheim School of Management (Germany)
15. Norwegian School of Economics (Norway)
16. ESADE Business School (Spain)
17. IESE Business School (Spain)
18. School of Business - Renmin (China)
19. School of Economics, Fudan University (China)
20. HKUST Business School (Hong Kong)
21. CUHK Business School (Hong Kong)
22. College of Commerce - NCCU (Taiwan)
23. NUS Business School, The National University of Singapore (Singapore)
24. Sasin Graduate Institute of Business Administration, The Chulalongkorn University (Thailand)
25. Kulliyyah of Economic and Management Science, International Islamic University Malaysia
26. Master of Management Program, The Gadjah Mada University (Indonesia)
27. Indian Institute of Management, Ahmedabad (India)
28. Indian Institute of management, Bangalore (India)

== Campus and student life ==
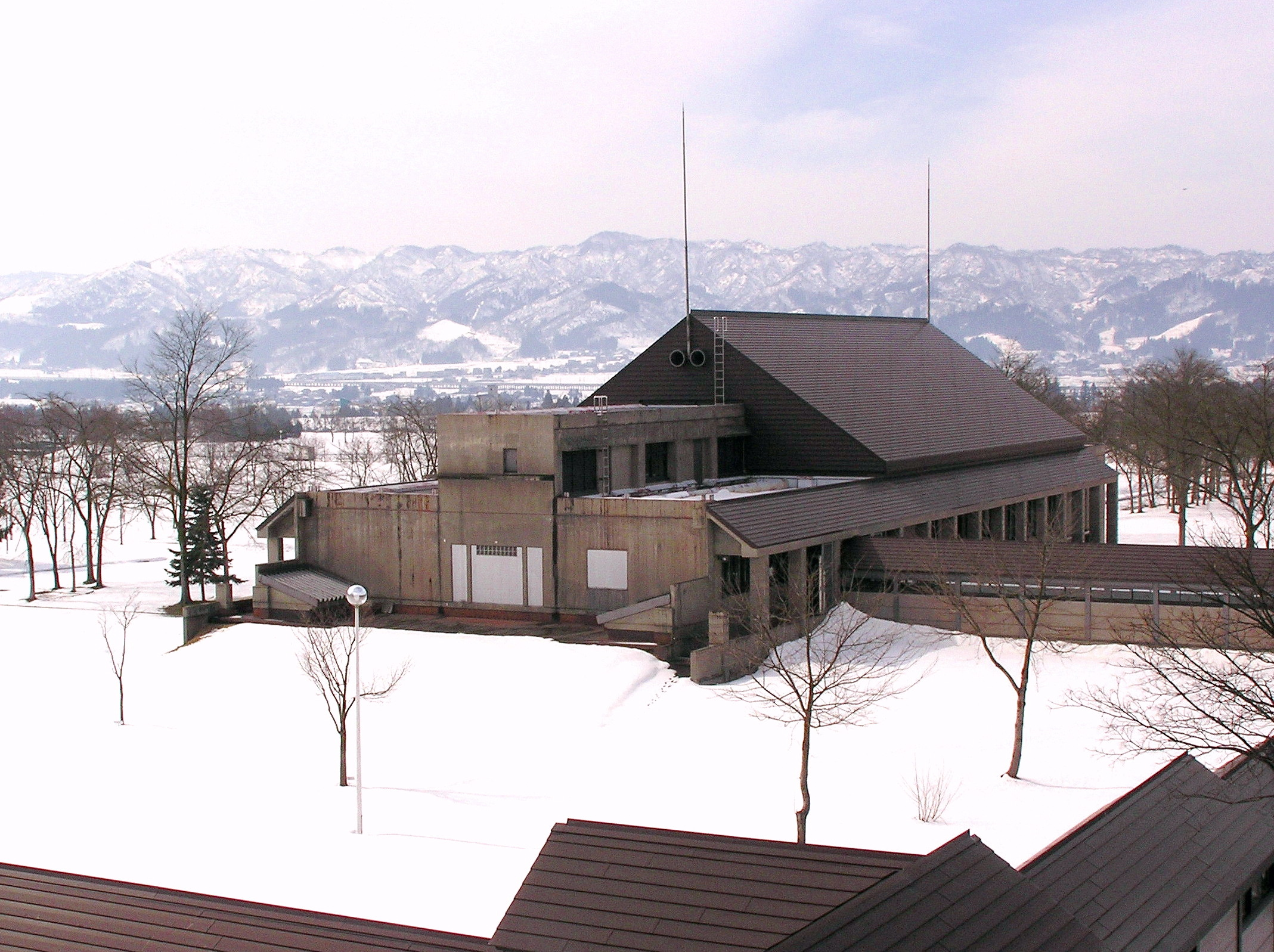
IUJ campus in winter, with the Echigo-Sanzan mountains in the background

=== Location ===
IUJ is located in Minamiuonuma, a small city in southeastern Niigata Prefecture, Japan. It is approximately 100 km south of Niigata City, the prefectural capital, and 230 km northwest of Tokyo.

=== Dormitory facilities ===
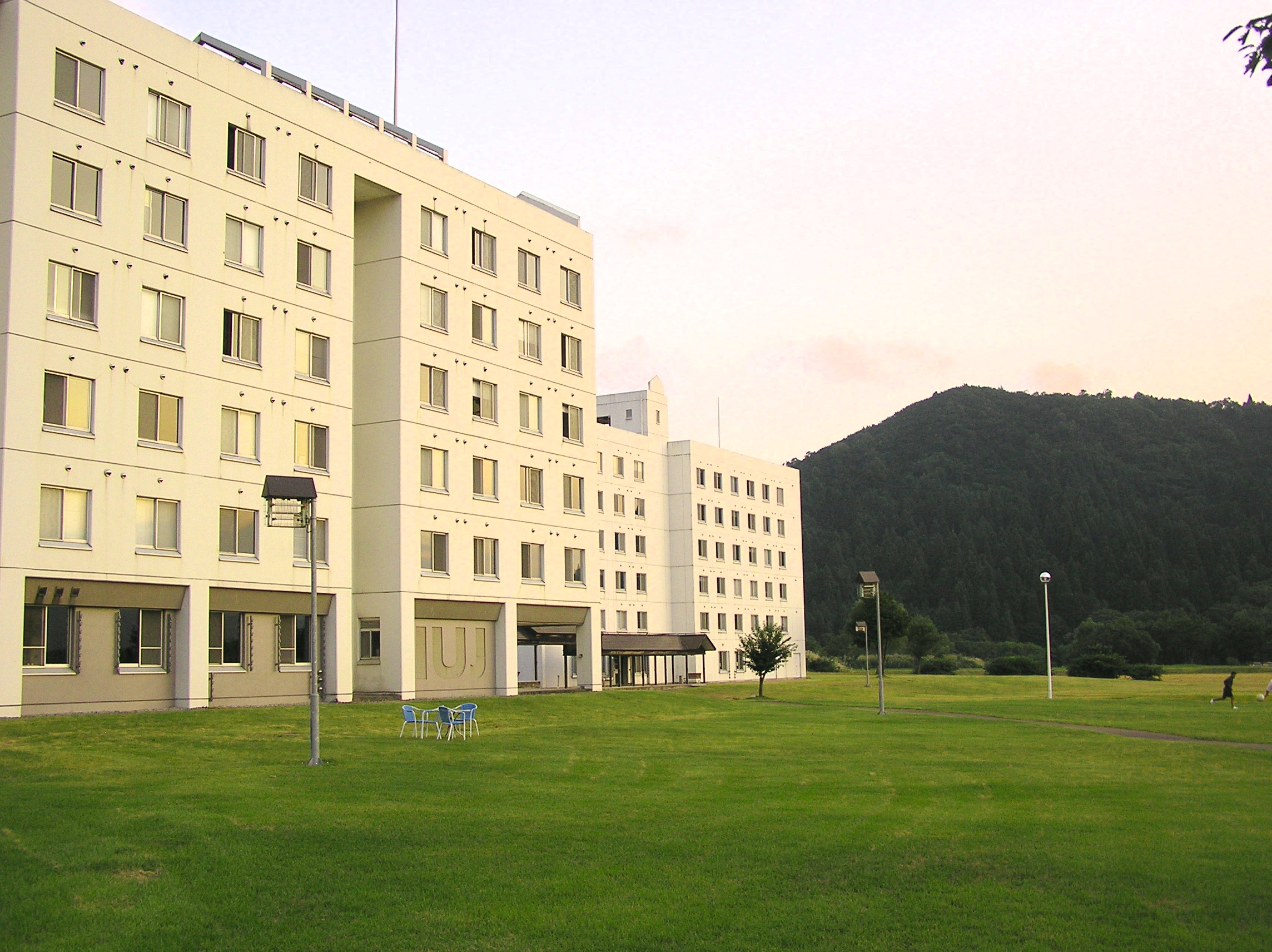
Student dormitories at IUJ

There are three single-student dormitories each housing about 100 students, and one Married-Student Apartments (MSA) with just 18 units for married couples. Each dormitory has inexpensive coin laundry/dryer facilities. All the single dormitory rooms are well-equipped and offer LAN connectivity. MSA is unfurnished. As there is a waiting list for the units, a lottery system is used to allocate them. For those needing to bring families with school aged children, off-campus housing options are supported by an English speaking land.

There is an on-campus convenience shop, Yamazaki. There are recreational and sporting facilities available to the students.

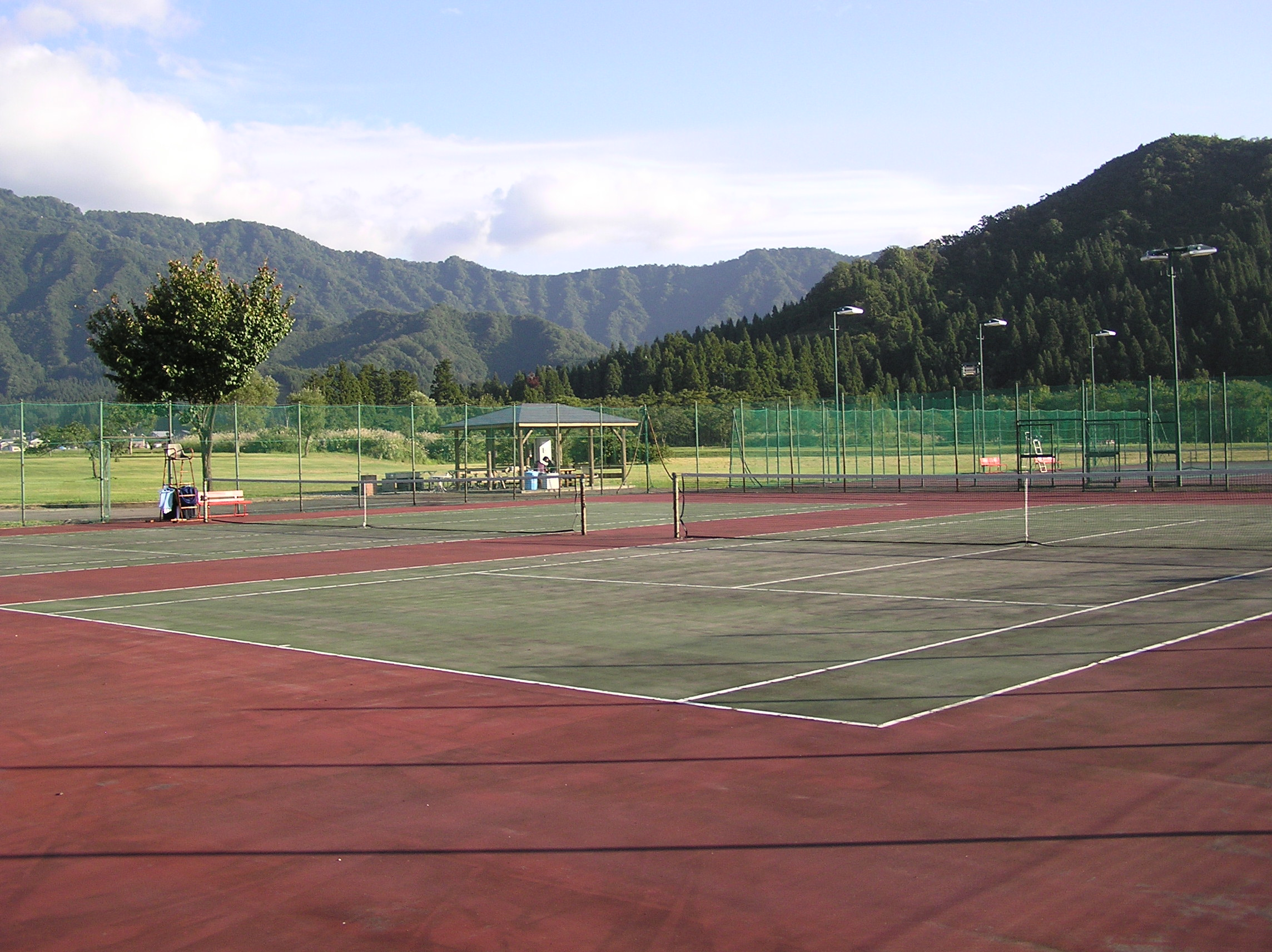
Tennis courts in scenic surroundings

=== Student activities and elected offices ===
Every full-time student enrolled in IUJ is automatically a member of the Graduate Student Organization (GSO), the students' union of IUJ. The GSO Executive Committee is a body of elected student representatives in-charge of general student welfare and campus life activities, plus outside events.

There are a number of annual on-campus and off-campus events organized by GSO with support from IUJ office and other clubs, such as IUJ Olympics, Ski Day, inter house sports events, International Day, cultural events, Haloween, holiday parties, music nights, game nights, etc.

Two other elected student groups are the IM Council and the IR Council. These groups take care of the academic welfare of the students in their respective schools (GSIM and GSIR), and in close cooperation and communications with the Deans offices.

== People ==
=== Founders ===
- Sohei Nakayama (中山 素平Nakayama Sohei), former chairman of the Japan Association of Corporate Executives (経済同友会Keizai Dōyukai), former president of the Industrial Bank of Japan
- Toshiwo Doko (土光 敏夫 Dokō Toshio), 4th chairman of the Japan Business Federation (経団連Keidanren)
- Shigeo Nagano (永野 重雄 Nagano Shigeo), 13th chairman of the Japan Chamber of Commerce and Industry (日本商工会議所Nihon-Syōkōkaigisyo)
- Tatsuzo Mizukami (水上 達三Mizukami Tatsuzō), 3rd chairman of the Japan Foreign Trade Council (日本貿易会Nihon-Bouekikai)
- Tadashi Sasaki (佐々木 直Sasaki Tadashi), 22nd Governor of the Bank of Japan (BOJ)

=== List of Chairman of the Board of Trustees ===
	Name	Period	Title
1st	Sohei Nakayama	1982-1987	Former chairman of the Japan Association of Corporate Executives, former president of the Industrial Bank of Japan
2nd	Jiro Ushio	1987-1989	Former chairman of the Japan Association of Corporate Executives, CEO of USHIO INC.
3rd	Toshihiro Tomabechi	1989-1990	Former CEO of the Mitsubishi Corporation
4th	Yushin Yamamuro	1991-1995	Former CEO of the Mitsubishi Bank, Ltd
5th	Yasuma Sugihara	1995-1999	Former CEO of the ExxonMobil Corporation
6th	Sogo Okamura	1999-2004	Professor emeritus, the university of Tokyo
7th	Yotaro Kobayashi	2004-2015	Co-chairman of the Japan Association of Corporate Executives
8th	Shoei Utsuda	2015-2025	Former CEO of the Mitsui & Co. Ltd.
9th	Fumia Kokubu	2025-	Former Chairman of the Mitsui & Co. Ltd.

=== List of presidents ===
	Name	Period	Title
1st	Saburo Okita	1982-1987	108th minister of foreign affairs
2nd	Shuntaro Shishido	1987-1994	Economist
3rd	George R. Packard 3rd	1994-1998	Former Dean of the Johns Hopkins School of Advanced International Studies (SAIS)
4th	Satoyuki Otsuki	1998-1999	Economist
5th	Takumi Shimano	1999-2002	Economist
6th	Yasuma Sugihara	2002-2003	Former CEO of the ExxonMobil Corporation
7th	Ippei Yamazawa	2003-2008	Economist
8th	Yasuma Sugihara	2007-2009	Former CEO of the ExxonMobil Corporation
9th	Masakatsu Mori	2009-2012	Former CEO of the Accenture public limited company
10th	Shinichi Kitaoka	2012-2015	Political scientist, former Japanese ambassador to the United Nations
11th	Kimio Kase	2015-2017	Economist
12th	Hiroyuki Itami	2017-2023	Economist, Emeritus Professor of Hitotsubashi University
13th	Takeo Kikkawa	2023-	Economist and Business Historian, Emeritus Professor of University of Tokyo and Hitotsubashi University

=== Alumni ===
- Business
  - Takashi Saeki (Japan), CEO of the TOHO GAS Company
  - Erol Emed (Turkey), CEO of the Soul of Japan K.K.
  - Toshiya Ishibashi (Japan), CEO of the SSP Co., Ltd.
  - Cenk Naci Gurol (Turkey), CEO of Aeon Global SCM
  - Masataka Jo (China), CEO of the Fuji Xerox China Limited
  - Charles Yin (China), chairman and CEO Worldwide City Group, founder of The China-Japan CEO Forum (CJCF)
  - Mike Takano (Japan), Industrial Tycoon
  - Ganzorig Vanchig (Mongolia), senior vice president of business portfolio firm Shunkhlai Group (2014 Young Global Leader by the World Economic Forum)
- Public Sector
  - Soe Han (Myanmar), Ambassador Extraordinary and Plenipotentiary of the Republic of the Union of Myanmar to Japan
  - Motohiro Ono (Japan), the Governor of Saitama Prefecture, former member of the House of Councillors in the Diet (national legislature)
  - Hiroyuki Abe (Japan), journalist (Fuji Television)
  - Yohei Mori (Japan), journalist (Mainichi Shimbun)
- Academic
  - Tomohito Shinoda (Japan), A faculty member of IUJ
  - Zubairu Wai, associate professor of Political Science and Global Development at University of Toronto Scaraborough
