= Citizen and Subject =

1996 book on colonialism by Mahmood Mamdani

Citizen and Subject: Contemporary Africa and the Legacy of Late Colonialism
- Author: Mahmood Mamdani
- Language: English
- Series: Princeton Studies in Culture/Power/History
- Publisher: Princeton University Press
- Publication date: 1996
- Publication place: United States
- ISBN: 978-0-691-01107-3
- Dewey Decimal: 320.9609045
- LC Class: JV246 .M35

Citizen and Subject: Contemporary Africa and the Legacy of Late Colonialism is a 1996 book by the Ugandan political scientist Mahmood Mamdani, published by Princeton University Press.

== Media interest in 2025 ==
The book gained renewed attention with media interest in the American politician Zohran Mamdani's election as mayor of New York, highlighting his intellectual background through his father Mahmood Mamdani's works and the role of the academic and cultural environment in which he was raised in shaping his interest in issues of justice and citizenship.

== Content of the Book ==
The book is divided into two sections and eight chapters.

- The first section, titled The Structure of the State, comprises five chapters: the introductory chapter, Thinking Through the African Dilemma, followed by Decentralized Despotism, Centralized Despotism Policies, Theory of Centralized Despotism, and Native Authority and Free Peasants.
- The second section, titled Anatomy of Resistance, contains three chapters: The Other Side of Tribalism – Peasant Movements in Tropical Africa, The Rural in the Urban – Migrant Workers in South Africa, and Connecting the Urban to the Rural.

The book offers an analytical reading of the colonial legacy in Africa, focusing on how colonial administrative structures, whether through direct or indirect rule or the apartheid system, shaped ethnic identities and social divisions that persisted after independence. Local authorities and tribal systems maintained by colonial powers reinforced these divisions, leaving postcolonial states as heirs to colonial governance structures repackaged under a national framework. Mamdani critically examines the theories of the "state" and "history" associated with Africa, emphasizing that the modern state emerged within this colonial context, marked by the separation of rural and urban areas and the enduring distinction between “citizen” and “subject.” The chapters highlight the enduring influence of the past on the present and emphasize the need to confront its legacies in order to develop more inclusive and just policies. Emerging at a time of renewed calls to deconstruct colonialism and rethink knowledge and politics, the work carries particular significance.

== Reception ==
The book Citizen and Subject has received widespread scholarly and cultural attention, particularly in African and Arab circles, with many researchers regarding it as a significant intellectual contribution to understanding the modern African state and the legacy of colonial administration. In his introduction to the Arabic translation, Helmy Shaarawi praised the depth of Mamdani’s research, noting that his analysis goes beyond the political sphere to address the social and cultural factors that shape the identity of African societies. Shaarawi considered the book a continuation of Mamdani’s long-standing work on Africa's social and political heritage, alongside his previous studies on population control, class formation in Uganda, the conflict in Darfur, and social movements on the continent. The book has been recognized as a significant contribution to the critique of sources of despotism in post-independence states, examining the relationship between centralization and decentralization, the structure of local authorities, the role of traditional leaders, and the impact of integrating African communities into the colonial capitalist market. Additionally, Mamdani’s analysis of the apartheid model as an administrative system capable of being reproduced outside South Africa has sparked in-depth discussions in academic circles.

Jean Copans from Michigan State University argues that M. Mamdani offers a new interpretation of colonial—and to some extent precolonial and postcolonial—Africa, taking into account the democratic demands of recent history.

== Sources ==
- Goede, Meike de (5 July 2017). An Analysis of Mahmood Mamdani's Citizen and Subject: Contemporary Africa and the Legacy of Late Colonialism. CRC Press. ISBN 978-1-351-35029-7.
