= V. Y. Mudimbe =

Congolese French philosopher and novelist (1941–2025)

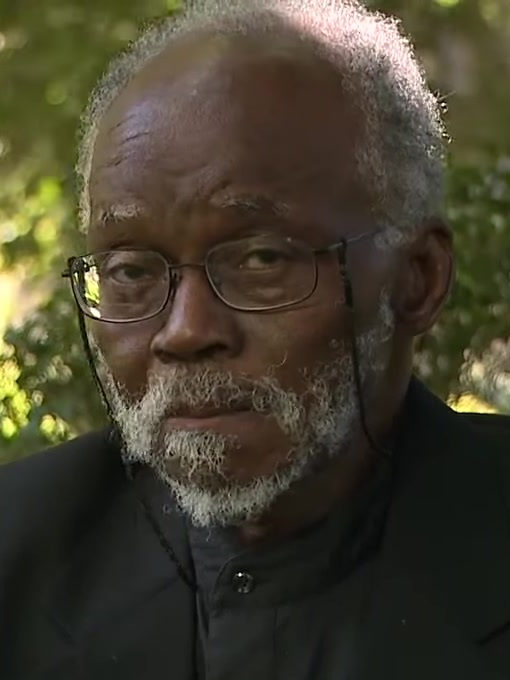
Mudimbe in 2013

Valentin-Yves Mudimbe (8 December 1941 – 22 April 2025) was a Congolese philosopher, academic and author of poems, novels, as well as books and articles on African culture and intellectual history. Mudimbe was Ruth F. DeVarney Professor of Romance Studies and professor of comparative literature at Duke University and maître de conférences at the École des hautes études en sciences sociales in Paris.

== Early life and career ==
Mudimbe was born in the Belgian Congo, now the Democratic Republic of the Congo. As a young man, he joined a monastery, but left in 1962 in order to study the forces that shaped African history. He studied in Louvain (PhD, 1970), came back to Congo, and flew to the United States in 1979 for political reasons. He taught at Haverford College and Stanford University, and was, until his death, Professor Emeritus in the Program in Literature at Duke University. His work has had impact on many disciplines including African studies, Philosophy, Sociology, Anthropology, Linguistics, Literature, and History.

== Work ==
Mudimbe's work is considered as highly influential for African studies, notably for his major book The Invention of Africa (1988). His writings transformed the intellectual history of Africa by challenging the dominant historic reconstruction of Greek philosophy which according to him was racialised. The influence of Mudimbe's writings for African studies was compared to that of Edward Said's book Orientalism for postcolonial studies. Mudimbe showed that without critiquing the epistemologies which were the basis of the discourses about Africa, critical approaches can become fruitless. He received the Herskovits Award given by African Studies Association in 1989.

Mudimbe focused most closely on phenomenology, structuralism, mythical narratives, and the practice and use of language. As a professor, he taught courses on these topics, as well as on ancient Greek cultural geography.

The University of Lubumbashi has built a library called “Mudimbe Library” where the works of Valentin-Yves Mudimbe can be consulted.

== Death ==
Mudimbe died in Chapel Hill, North Carolina, United States on 22 April 2025, at the age of 83.

== Education ==
- Junior College Degree, Lovanium University, Leopoldville (Kinshasa), Congo (1962)
- Diploma, Lovanium University, Kinshasa, Congo (1964)
- BA, Lovanium University, Kinshasa (1966)
- Graduate Studies, University of Paris (1968)
- PhD with High Honors, Catholic University of Leuven, Belgium (1970)

== Books ==
Novels

- Déchirures (1971)
- Entre les eaux (1973); trans. as Between Tides by Stephen Baker (1991)
- Entretailles (1973)
- L'Autre Face du royaume (1973)
- Les Fuseaux (1974)
- Le Bel immonde (1976); trans. as Before the Birth of the Moon by Marjolijn de Jager (1989)
- L'Ecart (1979); trans. as The Rift by Marjolijn de Jager (1993)
- Shaba deux (1988)
- Les Corps glorieux des mots et des êtres (1994)

Essays

- The Mudimbe Reader, Edited by Pierre-Philippe Fraiture and Daniel Orrells, University of Virginia Press.
- L'Odeur du père, Présence Africaine (1982)
- The Invention of Africa : Gnosis, Philosophy and the Order of Knowledge, Indiana University Press (1988)
- Parables and Fables : Exegesis Textuality and Politics in Central Africa, The University of Wisconsin Press (1991)
- The Surreptitious Speech: Presence Africaine and the Politics of Otherness 1947–1987, University of Chicago Press (1992)
- Africa & the Disciplines, coeditor, University of Chicago Press (1993)
- The Idea of Africa, African Systems of Thought, Indiana University Press, (1994)
- Tales of Faith: Religion as Political Performance in Central Africa, Athlone Press (1997)
- Nations, Identities, Cultures, editor, Duke University Press (1997)
- Diaspora and Immigration, coeditor, South Atlantic Quarterly special issue, Duke University Press (1999)
- The Normal & Its Orders, coeditor, Editions Malaïka (2007)
- On African Fault Lines: Meditations on Alterity Politics, University of KwaZulu-Natal Press (2013)

== Secondary literature ==
In English

- White fathers in colonial central Africa : a critical examination of V.Y. Mudimbe's theories on missionary discourse in Africa Friedrich Stenger, Münster : London : Lit, 2002.
- "Wylie on Mudimbe, 'The Idea of Africa'", Kenneth C. Wylie, H-Africa (1996).
- Singular performances : reinscribing the subject in Francophone African writing, Charlottesville : University of Virginia Press, 2002.
- "An Archaeology of African Knowledge: A Discussion of V. Y. Mudimbe", D. A. Masolo.
- Postcolonial theory and Francophone literary studies, Adlai Murdoch and Anne Donadey. Gainesville : University Press of Florida, 2005.
- Postcolonial Francophone autobiographies : from Africa to the Antilles Edgard Sankara, Charlottesville : University of Virginia Press, 2011.
- VY Mudimbe: Undisciplined Africanism Pierre-Philippe Fraiture, Liverpool, Liverpool University Press, 2013.
- Neil Lazarus (2005) Representation and terror in V.Y. Mudimbe, Journal of African Cultural Studies, 17:1, 81–101

In French

- V.Y. Mudimbe, ou, Le discours, l'écart et l'écriture, Bernard Mouralis, Présence Africaine, Paris, 1988
- Le roman africain face aux discours hégémoniques : étude sur l'énonciation et l'idéologie dans l'œuvre de V.Y. Mudimbe, Jean-Christophe Luhaka A. Kasende, L'harmattan 2001.
- L'Afrique au miroir des littératures, des sciences de l'homme et de la société : mélanges offerts à V.Y. Mudimbe, Kasende, Jean-Christophe Luhaka A, L'harmattan, 2003.
- V.Y. Mudimbe et la ré-invention de l'Afrique: poétique et politique de la décolonisation des sciences humaines, Kasereka Kavwhairehi, éditions Rodopi, 2006.
- Pour un nouvel ordre africain de la connaissance : hommage à V.Y. Mudimbe sous la direction de Alphonse Mbuyamba-Kankolongo, Paris, 2011.

== See also ==
- African philosophy
- List of American philosophers
- Postcolonialism
