= Laban Ayiro =

Kenyan academic (born 1957)

Professor Laban Ayiro
- Born: 1957 (age 68–69); Kibera, Nairobi, Kenya
- Education: McGill University (Bachelor of Education); United States International University Africa (Master of Arts in International Relations); University of Witwatersrand (Master of Education); Kenyatta University (Master of Science in Entrepreneurship) (Doctor of Philosophy in Entrepreneurship Development)
- Occupations: Educator, Academic, Academic Administrator
- Years active: 1977–present
- Title: Vice-Chancellor of Daystar University

Professor Laban Ayiro is a Kenyan academic, currently serving as the Vice Chancellor of Daystar University, a Christian, liberal arts university based in Nairobi, the capital and largest city of Kenya.

From September 2016 until March 2018, he was in acting capacity, the Vice Chancellor of Moi University, a public university, whose main campus is located in Kesses, Uasin Gishu County.

== Background and education ==
He was born in the Kibera slum in Nairobi. His parents were of modest means. His father, a driver, had friends whose economic means were better. One of those friends took in the young Ayiro because (a) Ayiro was a smart student and (b) that friend has a son and Ayiro would keep the son company.

His first degree, a Bachelor of Education, was awarded by McGill University, in Canada, in 1984. His second degree, a Master of Science in Entrepreneurship, was awarded by Kenyatta University, one of Kenya's public universities. His third degree, a Master of Arts in International Relations, was awarded in 2004 by the United States International University Africa, based in Nairobi. His fourth degree, a Doctor of Philosophy in Entrepreneurship Development was awarded by Kenyatta University in 2008. In 2013, the University of the Witwatersrand, in South Africa, awarded him his fifth degree, a Master of Education, in Education Finance, Economics and Planning.

== Career ==
His teaching career started out as a Chemistry teacher in 1977. After his first degree, he served as a Principal at several Kenyan High Schools including Lubinu boys in Mumias where he is regarded as the best principal the school has ever had. Prof Ayiro Dorm in Lubinu boys is named after him. He was then moved to the headquarters of the Kenyan Ministry of Education, where he served in different capacities, over time, including as (a) Provincial Director of Education, (b) Deputy Director of Staff Training and (c) Senior Deputy Director for Policy and Planning.

He has served as a Professor of Research Methods and Statistics at Moi University. He also worked as Director of Quality Assurance and Standards at the same institution. He is a consultant in Research, Organizational Leadership and Performance.

== Other considerations ==
Professor Ayiro undertook a post-doctoral fellowship at Texas A&M University, in College Station, Texas, in the United States, on a Fulbright Scholarship. He has published widely, with over twenty publications in his name.

In 2023, Ayiro participated in the CODESRIA College of Mentors Doctoral Students Mentorship Institute held in Nairobi, Kenya, where he delivered the keynote address under a pan-African programme, which brought together senior mentors and scholars, including Abdul Karim Bangura, Josephine Ahikire and Amy Niang, to strengthen doctoral research capacity across African universities.

== See also ==
- Education in Kenya
- List of universities in Kenya

Preceded by Prof James Kombo; June 2018 – February 2019	Vice Chancellor of Daystar University; March 2019 – present	Succeeded by Incumbent
