= Sunarko Suwito =

Indonesian diplomat (born 1964)

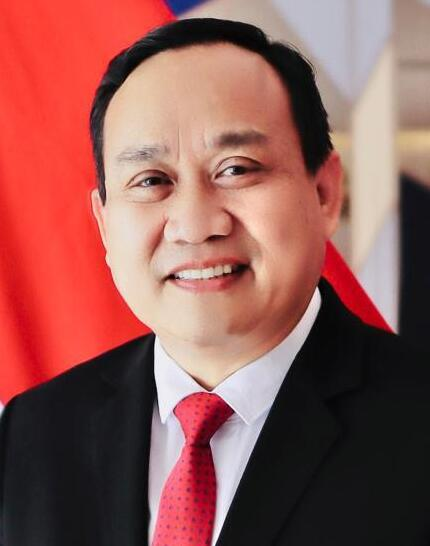

Ambassador of Indonesia to Sudan
- Incumbent
- Assumed office 11 January 2022
- Preceded by: Rossalis Rusman Adenan

Personal details
- Born: 18 July 1964 (age 61)
- Spouse: Ivo Meriyanti (died 2022)

Sunarko Suwito (born 18 July 1964) is an Indonesian diplomat who is currently serving as ambassador to Sudan since 2022. Previously, he served as the foreign ministry's director for the Middle East and consul general in Johor Bahru.

== Diplomatic career ==
Born on 18 July 1964, Sunarko joined the foreign ministry in March 1993. Around 2006, Sunarko served within the embassy in Damascus with the rank of first secretary. In 2013, he was assigned to the consulate general in Jeddah as consul for consular affairs with the rank of counsellor. Shortly after his arrival, he became the acting consul general.

Early in his tenure in Jeddah, the Saudi Arabia government held an amnesty program for undocumented workers, which allowed illegal workers to regularize their status without facing fines or imprisonment. The program's short deadline resulted in a surge of applicants for Travel Document in Lieu of an Indonesian Citizen Passport (Surat Perjalanan Laksana Paspor, SPLP), with 12,000 migrant workers flooding the consulate general at its peak. False rumors and the rush amongst the applicants cause riots, with stone throwing, fires, and attempts to storm the building. The riots resulted in the death of an applicant and hundreds of applicants fainted.

Following the incident, the consulate general received criticisms due to the lack of facilities and staff. The consulate general responded by increasing the number of staffs to improve its document processing capacity. Sunarko and other officials from the foreign and law ministry met with Abdullmonim Y Al Shehri from the Saudi Ministry of Labor to negotiate an extension of the amnesty program and propose improvements to labor contracts. Although the amnesty was extended to November, there were still thousands of Indonesian migrant workers that were unable to obtain proper documents and deported from the immigration detention centers.

=== Deputy chief of mission in Riyadh ===
After his service in Jeddah, Sunarko was transferred to the embassy in Riyadh as deputy chief of mission in 2015. He became the chargé d'affaires ad interim of the embassy, as the ambassador's post was vacant at that time. He continued to handle Indonesian migrant workers, and in August 2015 announced an amnesty program for Indonesian citizens to obtain SPLP. He stated that Saudi Arabia's vast territory poses a major challenge to Indonesian citizens, especially migrant workers, and suggested coordination via phone with community leaders to assist citizens more efficiently. Aside from protecting Indonesian citizen, Sunarko actively promoted Indonesia by holding a Trade, Tourism and Investment Corner (TTI Corner) and Indonesian Products Display at the embassy in March 2015 and holding tourism promotions in major cities.

=== Director and consul general ===
On 10 April 2017, Sunarko became the Middle East director within the foreign ministry. In 2018, he oversaw the launching of an Indonesian citizen protection online portal for the consulate general in Jeddah. On 22 April 2019, he was transferred to Malaysia as consul general in Johor Bahru. He began his duties on 1 June 2019 and served until 19 March 2022. During his tenure, Sunarko oversaw the development of several new building within the consulate general complex. On 1 December 2019, Sunarko laid out the foundation stone in a ceremony that marked the beginning of the construction of service room, temporary shelter, and office buildings. The new service room, along with the new Johor Bahru Indonesian school, a school dedicated to Indonesians living within the jurisdiction of the consulate general, was finished in 2021.

=== Ambassador to Sudan ===
On 4 June 2021, Sunarko was nominated by President Joko Widodo as ambassador to Sudan. His nomination was approved by the House of Representatives first commission after passing an assessment on 12 July 2021 and was installed as ambassador on 12 January 2022. He presented his credentials to the President of the Transitional Sovereignty Council Abdel Fattah al-Burhan on 7 July 2022.

Following the start of the Sudanese civil war in April 2023, the foreign ministry evacuated Indonesian citizens in Sudan, with Sunarko personally leading the first wave of evacuation. During the evacuation process, Sunarko and other embassy staff resided in Port Sudan to observe the evacuation. For his role in leading the evacuation, Sunarko received the 2023 Hassan Wirajuda Indonesian Citizen Protection Award in April 2024.

== Personal life ==
Sunarko was married to Ivo Meriyanti, who died on 4 March 2022.
