= Lyn Ossome =

Kenyan feminist scholar

- Born: Marilyn Ossome; Kenya
- Citizenship: Kenyan
- Occupation: Senior Research Fellow

Academic background
- Education: PhD in Political Studies
- Alma mater: University of the Witwatersrand

Academic work
- Discipline: Political Studies
- Notable works: Gender, Ethnicity and Violence in Kenya's Transitions to Democracy: States of Violence

Marilyn ('Lyn') Ossome is an academic, specialising in feminist political theory and feminist political economics. She is a Senior Research Associate of at the University of Johannesburg and a member of the advisory board for the Strategic Initiative for Women in the Horn of Africa. She is an editorial board member of Agrarian South: Journal of Political Economy.

Ossome wrote Gender, Ethnicity and Violence in Kenya’s Transitions to Democracy: States of Violence in 2018, and co-edited the volume Labour Questions in the Global South in 2021 She is the incumbent President of Council for the Development of Social Science Research in Africa (CODESRIA).

== Biography ==
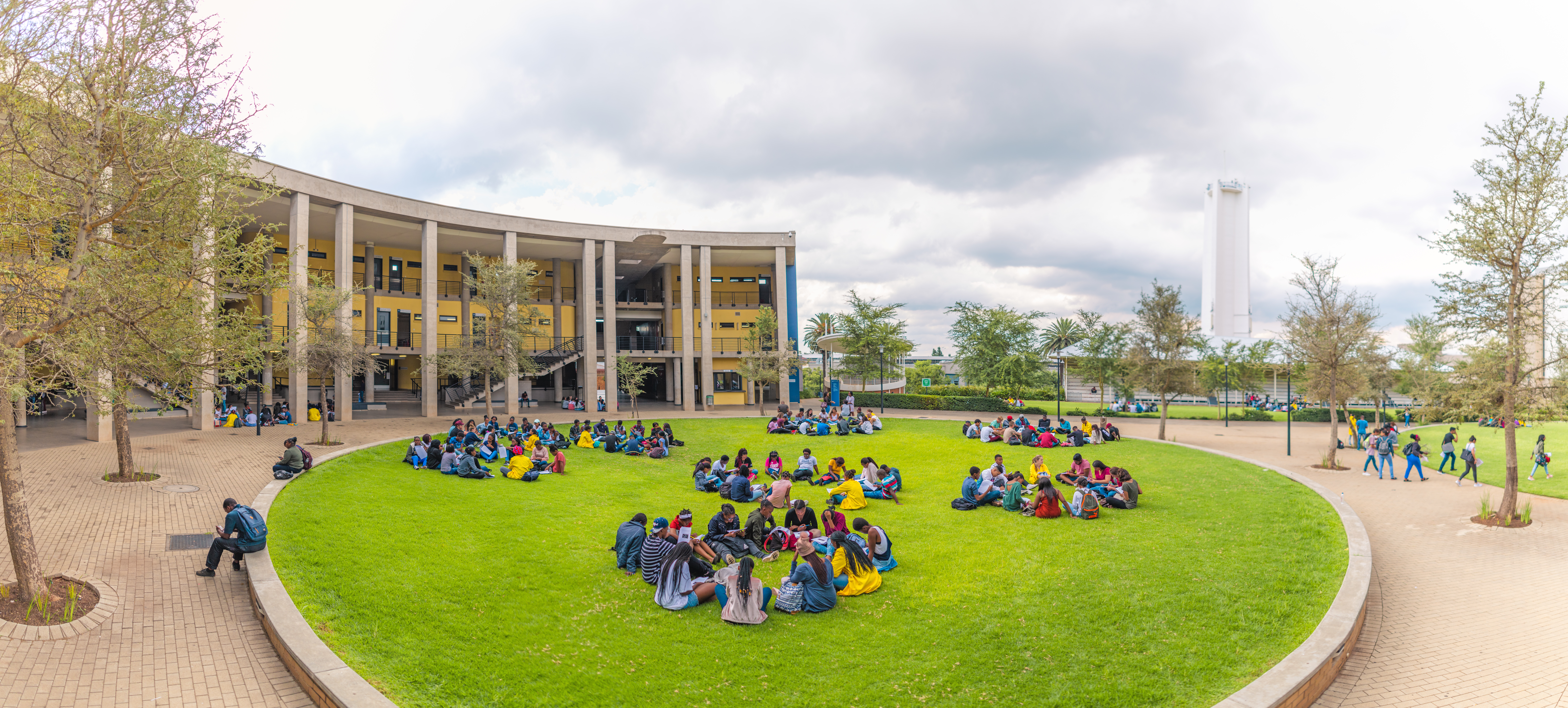
Science Stadium, University of the Witwatersrand

Lyn Ossome was born and raised in Kenya. She holds a PhD in Political Studies from University of the Witwatersrand, Johannesburg. From 2016 to 2021 she was Senior Research Fellow at the Makerere Institute of Social Research, at Makerere University in Uganda. She describes her academic approach as 'a kind of activist-scholarship'.

== Career ==
Ossome's research focuses particularly on gendered labour, queer feminist history and gendered violence, as well as agrarian and land studies. Her work on feminism includes articles on Arab refugee women, Kenyan media and anti-rape discourse, and agrarian movements in Africa.

Her 2018 book Gender, Ethnicity and Violence in Kenya’s Transitions to Democracy: States of Violence examined 'the democratization process and sexual/gendered violence observed against women during electioneering periods in Kenya'. In 2021, she co-edited the volume Labour Questions in the Global South.

In 2016, Ossome was a visiting scholar at the National Chiao Tung University in Taiwan. She was also Visiting Presidential Professor in Women's, Gender and Sexuality Studies at Yale University from 2016-17.

Ossome serves on the board of the International Association for Feminist Economics (IAFFE. She is currently serving as CODESRIA Executive Committee member and President. She is an editorial board member of Agrarian South: Journal of Political Economy, and serves on the advisory board of Feminist Africa.

== Critical work ==
Ossome's academic work is grounded in feminist political economy and decolonial feminist theory, where she questions the structural and systemic production of inequality through the intersections of gender, labor and rural agricultural development in colonial and post-colonial period. Her work highlights women's unpaid labor and social reproduction that has sustained households and national economies; yet women their contribution has remained undervalued within capitalistic and liberal development framework. She observes that women in controlled labor and markets are unvalued compared to men that has led to systemic pauperization in the modern African independent societies.

Ossome argues that the current global capitalistic markets are the cause of massive immiseration of working class in underdeveloped countries. She raises critical implications of this gendered structure, first she argues that the class struggle has reduced social formations into capitalistic frameworks, which tends to shift this struggle from the center to the peripheries, issues like women struggle are to the same periphery as a working class. Secondly, she points out that the political framework within anticapitalism struggles is waged, which has not sufficiently captured the tension between labor and capitalism. Lastly, calls for national sovereignty and liberation as a fundamental condition for safeguarding the possibility of survival of most parts of the world. She calls for liberation of the labored gender regimes for genuine liberation form capitalistic systems to take place in Third world countries.

Ossome has also researched and documented electoral gender-based violence in Kenya. She raises concern on online harassment, misinformation and gendered political violence on women, where women are attacked through social media, name calling, body shaming and negative political messaging. As a result of these tactics exclusion of women in politics remain a norm in Kenya.

== Selected publications ==
- Ossome, Lyn and Naidu, Srisha C (2021). 'Does Land Still Matter? Gender and Land Reforms in Zimbabwe'. Agrarian South: Journal of Political Economy. 10(2): 344–370 https://doi.org/10.1177/22779760211029176
- Ossome, Lyn (2021). 'Land in transition: from social reproduction of labour power to social reproduction of power' Journal of Contemporary African Studies. 39(4): 550-564. https://doi.org/10.1080/02589001.2021.1895431
- Ossome, Lyn (2021). 'The care economy and the state in Africa’s Covid-19 responses'. Canadian Journal of Development Studies / Revue canadienne d'études du développement, 42(1-2), 68-78.https://doi.org/10.1080/02255189.2020.1831448
- Ossome Lyn (2021). 'Pedagogies of Feminist Resistance: Agrarian Movements in Africa'. Agrarian South: Journal of Political Economy. 10(1):41-58. https://doi.org/10.1177/22779760211000939
- Ossome, Lyn and Naidu, Srisha C (2021). 'The Agrarian Question of Gendered Labour' in Labour Questions in the Global South. Palgrave Macmillan. https://doi.org/10.1007/978-981-33-4635-2_4
- Ossome, Lyn 'African Feminism' in Rabaka, R. (Ed.). (2020). Routledge Handbook of Pan-Africanism (1st ed.). Routledge. https://doi.org/10.4324/9780429020193
- Ossome, Lyn (2022). Introduction: The social reproductive question of land contestations in Africa. African Affairs, 121(484), e9-e24. https://doi.org/10.1093/afraf/adab032
