= Mahmood Mamdani =

Ugandan anthropologist and academic (born 1946)

Mahmood Mamdani FBA
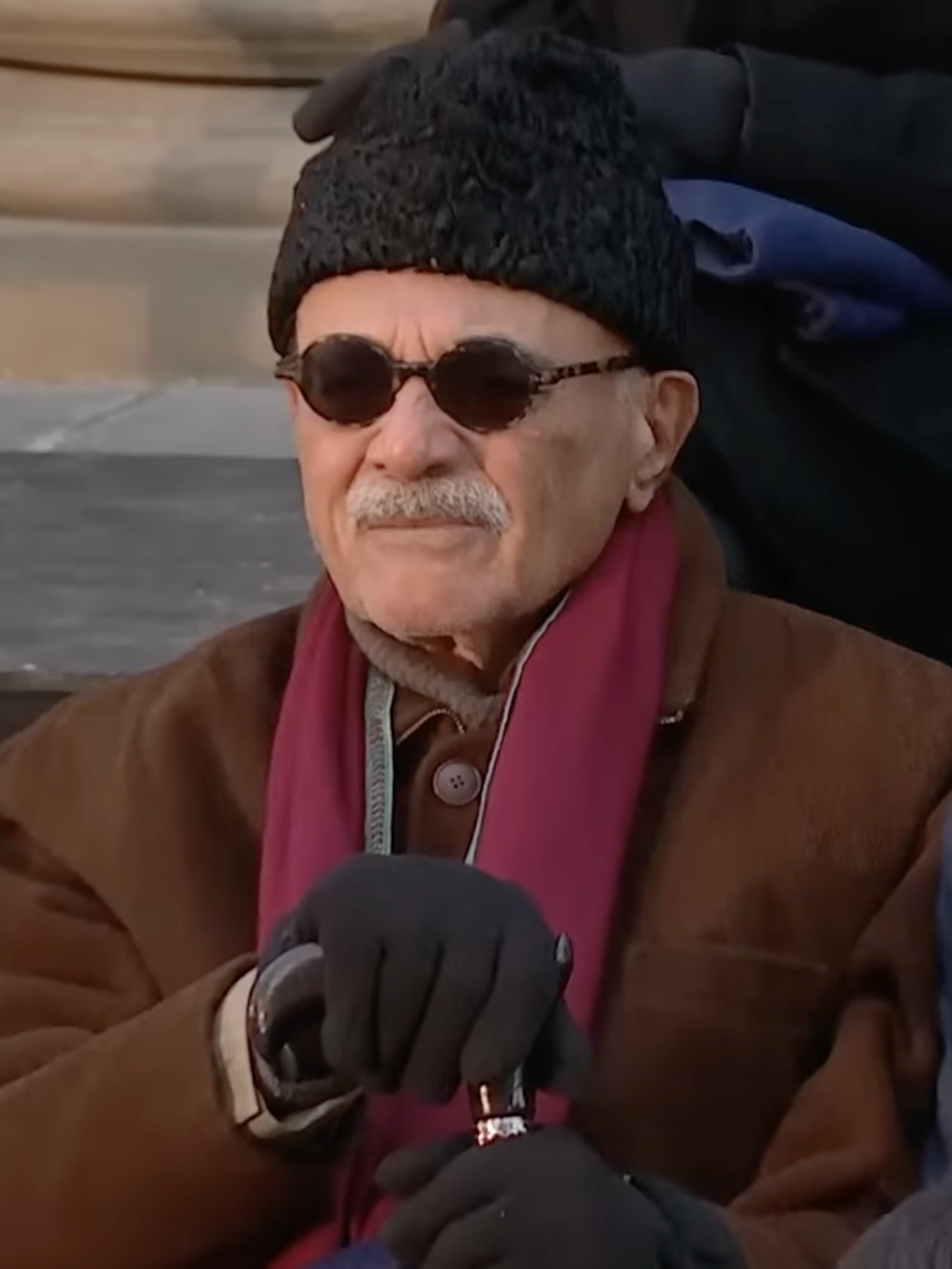
- Mamdani in 2026
- Born: 23 April 1946 (age 80); Bombay, Bombay Province, British India (now Mumbai, Maharashtra, India)
- Citizenship: Uganda
- Occupations: Anthropologist; academic; political commentator
- Spouse: Mira Nair (m. 1991)
- Children: Zohran Mamdani

Academic background
- Education: University of Pittsburgh (BA); Tufts University (MA, MA); Harvard University (PhD)
- Thesis: Politics and Class Formation in Uganda (1974)
- Doctoral advisor: Karl Deutsch

Academic work
- Discipline: Political science
- Institutions: University of Dar es Salaam; University of Cape Town; Columbia University
- Notable works: Citizen and Subject (1996)

Mahmood Mamdani (Note: English: /mɑːˈmuːd məmˈdɑːni/ mah-MOOD məm-DAH-nee, Gujarati: [mə(ɦ)ˈmud mɑmˈdɑɳi].) (born 23 April 1946) is a Ugandan anthropologist, academic, and political commentator. He is the Herbert Lehman Professor of Government and a professor of anthropology, political science, and African studies at Columbia University. He also served as the chancellor of Kampala International University in Uganda, and honorary professor at the Centre for African Studies at the University of Cape Town.

He was previously the director of the Makerere Institute of Social Research (MISR) in Kampala, Uganda, from 2010 until 2022. Mamdani specialises in the study of African and international politics, colonialism and post‐colonialism, and the politics of knowledge production. He is married to filmmaker Mira Nair, and is the father of New York City Mayor Zohran Mamdani.

== Early life and education ==
Mahmood Mamdani was born on 23 April 1946 in Bombay (now Mumbai), India, the year before the end of British Raj. He was raised in Kampala, Uganda, as part of the Indian diaspora in Southeast Africa. Both his parents were born and raised in the British territory of Tanganyika (present-day Tanzania) in East Africa. His parents moved to Bombay while his father attended college there. The family returned to Dar es Salaam, Tanganyika, when Mamdani was two, and moved to Uganda when he was five or six years old.

At the time, Uganda was racially segregated, including where people lived, the schools, the mosques, and children's play areas. For his primary school education, Mamdani first attended a madrasa, and then the Government Indian Primary School. He grew up speaking Gujarati, Urdu, and Swahili. He started studying English in sixth grade. After junior secondary school, he attended Old Kampala Senior Secondary School, where he was secretary of the Do-it-Yourself Physics club.

Mamdani was one of 23 Ugandan students in the 1963 group of the Kennedy Airlift, a US-funded scholarship program that brought hundreds of East Africans to universities in the United States and Canada between 1959 and 1963. Mamdani graduated with a Bachelor of Arts degree from the University of Pittsburgh in 1967.

He was among the many students in the northern United States who made the bus journey south to Montgomery, Alabama in March 1965 to participate in the civil rights movement for a march organized by the Student Nonviolent Coordinating Committee. Mamdani was jailed during the march and allowed to make a phone call. He contacted the Ugandan ambassador in Washington, DC for assistance. The ambassador asked him why he was "interfering in the internal affairs of a foreign country", to which he responded that this was not an internal affair but a freedom struggle and that Ugandans, too, had gotten their freedom only the year before. Soon after, Mamdani learned about the work of Karl Marx when two FBI agents visited him to find out why he had attended the march and, during the questioning, asked him whether he liked Marx, with whom he was not familiar before their visit.

Mamdani attended the Fletcher School of Law and Diplomacy of Tufts University and graduated with a Master of Arts degree in political science in 1968 and a Master of Arts degree in law and diplomacy in 1969. He obtained his doctor of philosophy degree in government from Harvard University in 1974, under the direction of Karl Deutsch. His thesis was titled Politics and Class Formation in Uganda.

== Career ==
Mamdani returned to Uganda in early 1972 and was employed by Makerere University in Kampala as a teaching assistant, at the same time conducting his doctoral research. He and most Asians were expelled later that year by Ugandan dictator Idi Amin because of their ethnicity; Amin intended to "reclaim" Asian-owned businesses and properties. Mamdani left Uganda for a refugee camp in the United Kingdom in early November.

He left England in mid-1973 after being recruited to the University of Dar es Salaam in Tanzania, where he completed his dissertation. He was active in anti-Amin groups in Tanzania. In 1979, he attended the Moshi Conference as an observer. He returned to Uganda after Amin was overthrown following the Uganda–Tanzania War in 1979. During this period, he was employed as an intern with the All Africa Conference of Churches, an ecumenical Christian alliance based in Nairobi, Kenya, working at the Church of Uganda's Kampala office.

From 1980 (following Amin's ouster in 1979) until 1993 he was again employed by Makerere University. In 1984, while attending a conference in Dakar, Senegal, he became stateless after his Ugandan citizenship was withdrawn by the government under Milton Obote because of his criticism of its policies. He returned to Dar es Salaam. After Obote was deposed for the second time, Mamdani once again returned to Uganda in June 1986.

He was the founding director of the Centre for Basic Research (CBR), Uganda's first non-governmental research organisation, where he served from 1987 to 1996.

He was also a visiting professor at the University of Durban-Westville in South Africa (January to June 1993), at the Nehru Memorial Museum & Library in New Delhi (January to June in 1995), and at Princeton University (1995–96).

In 1996, he was appointed the inaugural holder of the AC Jordan chair of African studies at the University of Cape Town, and in early 1997 became head of the Centre for African Studies (CAS). He left after having disagreements with the (mostly white) faculty over the draft of his syllabus for a foundation course on Africa called "Problematising Africa". Mamdani, who labelled the present syllabus as "Bantu studies" (in a reference to education of Black people under the apartheid regime) was suspended and eventually resigned. "The Mamdani affair" continues to be referenced in debates about the decolonisation of higher education. He later said that there was no personal bitterness, and he had many enduring relationships from his time there. He said it was about differences in perspective, in particular the structure of the curriculum with regard to the study of South Africa as an African country. He was later (2018) brought back into the fold as a highly regarded honorary professor. (Note: Mamdani later said "I was a strong critic of the then mainstream tendency at UCT which saw the South African experience as exceptional. I did not argue that South Africa was the same as any other African country, but I did insist on a comparative understanding of the African experience as necessary if students were to study South Africa's history as a variant within the broader context of colonialism and post-colonialism in Africa". According to director of CAS Ntsebeza in 2018, "the core African Studies course he argued for … was successfully implemented as a core course at postgraduate level in African Studies, and much of the themes within his scholarship have been introduced in the highly successful foundational African Studies major first rolled out in 2017".)

In 1999, Mamdani was appointed director of the Institute of African Studies at Columbia University, a post he held until 2004. He has continued to teach there ever since (as of 2025).

He was the director of the Makerere Institute of Social Research (MISR) in Kampala, Uganda, from 2010 until 2022.

As of November 2025 he is the Herbert Lehman Professor of Government and a professor of anthropology, political science, and African studies at Columbia University.

He also serves as the chancellor of Kampala International University in Uganda.

Mamdani has been on leave from Columbia since September 2025.

== Research and writing ==
Mamdani specialises in the study of African and international politics, colonialism and post‐colonialism, and the politics of knowledge production. His works have explored the intersection of politics and culture, comparative study of colonialism since 1452, the history of civil war and genocide in Africa, the Cold War and the war on terror, and the theoretical history of human rights.

In his 1996 book, Citizen and Subject: Contemporary Africa and the Legacy of Colonialism, he argued that the post-colonial state cannot be understood without a clear analysis of the institutional colonial state. The nature of the colonial state in Africa was a response to the dilemma of the "native question", and he argued that it took on the form of a "bifurcated state". This was characterised on the one hand by "direct rule", which was a form of "urban civil power" and focused on the exclusion of natives from civil freedoms guaranteed to citizens in civil society, and on the other hand by indirect rule, which was rural in nature and involved the incorporation of "natives" into a "state enforced customary order" enforced by a "rural tribal authority", which he termed as "decentralised despotism". This state was "Janus faced" and "contained a duality: two forms of power under a single hegemonic authority". In the post-colonial realm, the urban sphere was to an extent deracialised but the rural one remained subject to quasi-colonial control, whether at the hands of conservative rulers for whom it provided their own power base or at those of radical rulers with centralised authoritarian projects of their own. In this way both experiences reproduced "one part of the dual legacy of the bifurcated state and created their own distinctive version of despotism". Mamdani analyses historical case studies in South Africa and Uganda to argue that colonial rule tapped into authoritarian possibilities whose legacies often persist after independence. Challenging conventional perceptions of apartheid in South Africa as exceptional, he argues that apartheid was the generic form of a European colony in Africa, encompassing aspects of indirect rule and association.

In his 2004 book Good Muslim, Bad Muslim: America, the Cold War, and the Roots of Terror, Mamdani argues that suicide bombers should be recognized "as a category of soldier" and "understood as a feature of modern political violence rather than stigmatized as a mark of barbarism". Academics defended the book from criticism that this was advocacy of suicide bombing, saying that it is in fact a scholarly examination of how "'U.S. foreign policy decisions, especially during the Cold War, helped create the kinds of conditions in which militant Islamism and political violence' was perpetrated."

His essays have appeared in the London Review of Books and other publications. According to the University of Cape Town (UCT)’s Centre for African Studies, Mamdani's texts "have been core readings [...] on the major debates on the study of African history and politics, exploring the intersection between politics and culture, comparative studies of colonialism, civil wars and the state, and genocide in Africa."

His 2025 book Slow Poison: Idi Amin, Yoweri Museveni, and the Making of the Ugandan State, published by Harvard University Press, examines the arc of authoritarian governance in Uganda from Idi Amin through the Museveni era. It blends political analysis with personal memoir.

== Other activities ==
From the late 1990s until 2002, Mamdani served as president of the Council for the Development of Social Science Research in Africa.

In December 2001, he gave a speech on "Making Sense of Violence in Postcolonial Africa" at the Nobel Centennial Symposium in Oslo, Norway.

In September 2006, Mamdani was among the invited speakers at the Ugandan North American Association (UNAA) convention in New York City.

In May 2011, at the time of the Tahrir Square protests in Cairo, Mamdani was invited to give a talk at the American University of Cairo. Addressing students at the University of KwaZulu-Natal in South Africa in 2012, he compared this with the 1976 Soweto uprising.

In October 2011, Mamdani (alongside Rhoda Ann Kanaaneh) served as keynote speaker at the inaugural national conference for Students for Justice in Palestine.

In 2017 he was invited to give the TB Davie Memorial Lecture on academic freedom at the University of Cape Town, and his talk, titled "Decolonising the Post-Colonial University" gave rise to much debate.

From December 2017 until March 2018, Mamdani served as Rajni Kothari Chair Professor at the Centre for the Study of Developing Societies in Delhi. After his term ended, on 4 April 2018 he delivered the annual Rajni Kothari Chair lecture, titled "Thinking of Justice through Africa's Experience in the 20th Century".

He has appeared as an expert in the documentaries Rwanda: The Untold Story (2014, BBC), The Dictator's Playbook (2018, PBS), and How to Become a Tyrant (2021, Netflix). He appeared in a cameo in the 2012 film The Reluctant Fundamentalist, directed by his wife Mira Nair.

In 2024, Mamdani joined The Gaza Tribunal, a civil-society initiative established in London to investigate Israeli war crimes in the Gaza war.

== Recognition ==
In 2008, in an open online poll, Mamdani was voted as the ninth "top public intellectual" in the world on the list of Top 100 Public Intellectuals by Prospect Magazine (UK) and Foreign Policy (US).

In July 2017, Mamdani was elected a Corresponding Fellow of the British Academy (FBA).

On 28 May 2018 (Africa Day), Mamdani was appointed honorary professor at the Centre for African Studies (CAS) at the University of Cape Town. CAS director Lungisile Ntsebeza called the appointment "institutionally historic" and important in the process of the university's decolonisation since the "Rhodes Must Fall" student protests in March 2015.

=== Awards and nominations ===
- 1997: Herskovits Prize for Citizen and Subject
- 1999: University of Cape Town Book Award for Citizen and Subject
- 2009: GDS Eminent Scholar Award from the International Studies Association
- 2011: Lenfest Distinguished Faculty Award from Columbia University
- 2012: Scholar of the Year from the African Diaspora Awards
- 2012: Ugandan Diaspora Award 2012
- 2021: Shortlisted for the British Academy Book Prize for Global Cultural Understanding for Neither Settler Nor Native
- 2021: Finalist for the PROSE Award in World History for Neither Settler Nor Native

=== Honorary degrees ===
- 25 May 2010: University of Johannesburg, DLitt (Honoris Causa)
- 24 July 2010: Addis Ababa University, DLitt (Honoris Causa)
- 24 April 2012: University of KwaZulu-Natal, DLitt (Honoris Causa)

== Personal life ==
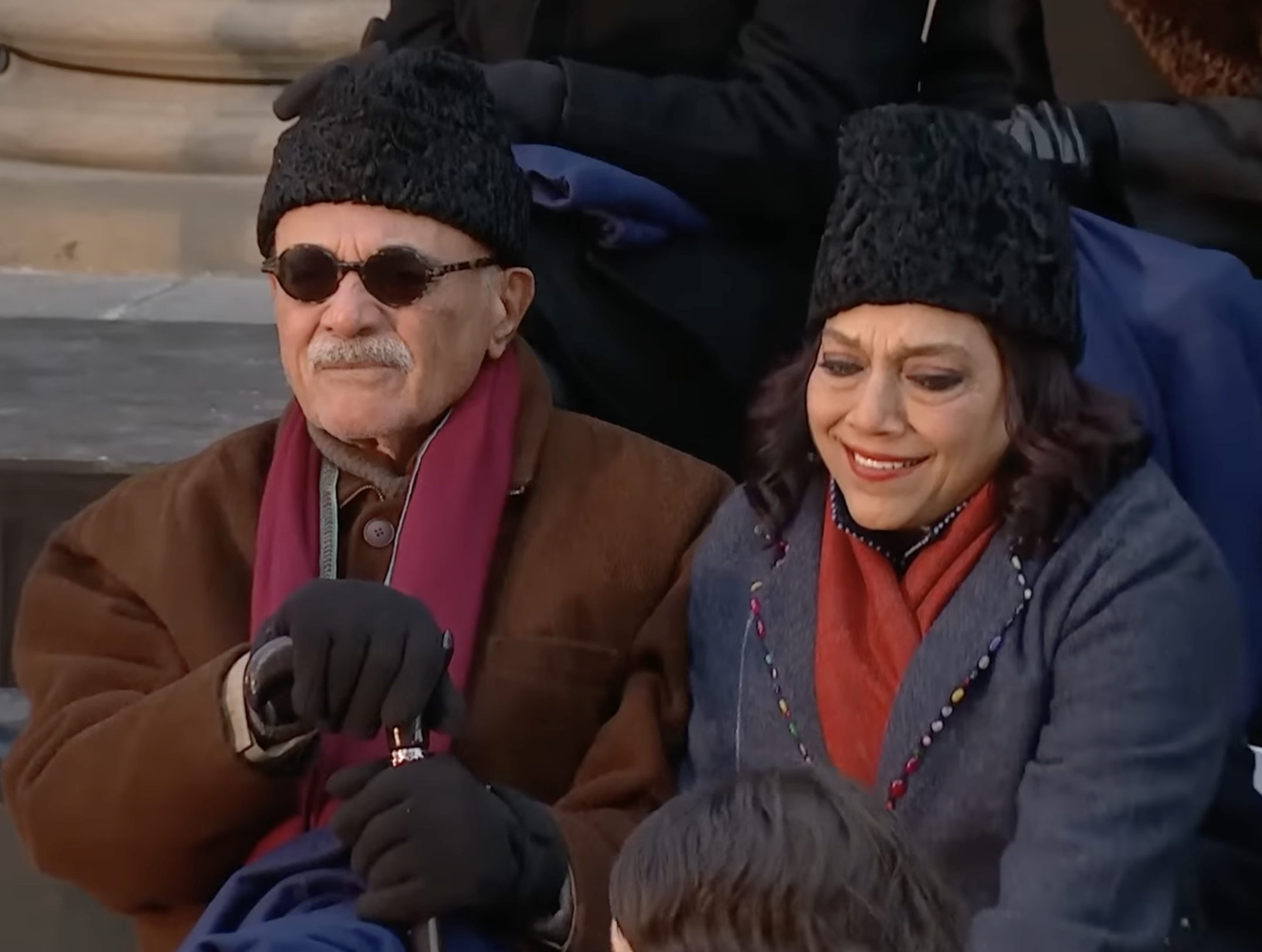
Mamdani and Nair in the crowd of their son Zohran Mamdani's inauguration

Mamdani married Mira Nair, an Indian Hindu film director and producer based in the United States, in 1991. They first met in Nairobi, Kenya, and then again in Kampala, Uganda, in 1989 when Nair was conducting research for her film Mississippi Masala. As of 2025, Mamdani and Nair live in the Morningside Heights neighborhood of Manhattan.

Mamdani and Nair's only child, Zohran Mamdani, was born in Kampala in 1991. In 1996 the family moved to Cape Town, South Africa, for Mahmood Mamdani to take up an appointment as head of the African studies program at the University of Cape Town, and lived there for around three years. Around 1999, they moved to the US and settled in New York. Zohran Mamdani became a politician and has been the Mayor of New York City since 1 January 2026, having been a member of the New York State Assembly from 2021 to 2025. His mayoral campaign was supported by his parents.

== Bibliography ==
=== Books ===
- The Myth of Population Control: Family, Class and Caste in an Indian Village (1972)
- From Citizen to Refugee: Ugandan Asians Come to Britain (1973)
- Politics and Class Formation in Uganda (1976)
- Imperialism and Fascism in Uganda (1984)
- Academic Freedom in Africa (1994)
- Citizen and Subject: Contemporary Africa and the Legacy of Late Colonialism (1996)
- When Victims Become Killers: Colonialism, Nativism and Genocide in Rwanda (2001)
- Understanding the Crisis in Kivu
- Good Muslim, Bad Muslim: America, the Cold War and the Roots of Terror (2004)
- Scholars in the Marketplace. The Dilemmas of Neo-Liberal Reform at Makerere University, 1989–2005 (2007)
- Saviors and Survivors: Darfur, Politics, and the War on Terror (2009)
- Define and Rule: Native as Political Identity (The W.E.B. DuBois Lectures) (2012)
- Neither Settler nor Native: The Making and Unmaking of Permanent Minorities (2020)
- Slow Poison: Idi Amin, Yoweri Museveni, and the Making of the Ugandan State (2025)

=== Collected essays ===
- Beyond Rights Talk and Culture Talk: Comparative Essays on the Politics of Rights and Culture (2000)

=== Edited volumes ===
- Uganda Studies in Labour (Codesria Book Series) (1968)

=== Other works ===
- Studies in Labor Markets (National Bureau of Economic Research Universities-National Bureau Conference Ser)
- African Studies in Social Movements and Democracy (Actes-Sud Papiers)

== See also ==
- Indians in the New York City metropolitan area
- Ugandan Americans

== Notes ==
Academic offices
Preceded by George Clement Bond	Director of the Institute of African Studies at Columbia University; 1999–2004	Succeeded by Mamadou Diouf
Preceded by Nakanyike Musisi	Director of the Makerere Institute of Social Research; June 2010 – February 2022	Succeeded by Lyn Ossome
