= Cangandala =

Town and commune in Angola

- Municipality and town
- Location in Angola
- Coordinates: 9°47′S 16°26′E
- Country: Angola
- Province: Malanje

Area
  - Municipality and town: 5,770 km^{2} (2,230 sq mi)

Population
  - Estimate (mid 2019): 52,220
  - Density: 9/km^{2} (23/sq mi)
  - Urban: 16,232
- Time zone: UTC+1 (WAT)

Cangandala (or Kangandala) is a town and municipality in the province of Malanje (Malange) in Angola. It covers an area of 5,770 square kilometres (2,230 sq mi) and its population is 45,120 (2014 census).

Cangandala is bordered to the north by the municipalities of Mucari and Malanje (Malange), to the east by the municipality of Cambundi-Catembo, to the south by the municipality of Luquembo, and to the west by the municipality of Mussende.

The municipality contains the comunas (communes) of Cangandala, Caribo, Culamagia and Mbembo.
