= Kelkar =

Kelkar is a surname native to the Indian state of Maharashtra. It is found mainly among Chitpavan Brahmin community.

== Notable people ==
Notable people with the surname include:

- Akshay Kelkar (born 1993), Indian actor
- Anita Date-Kelkar (born 1980), Indian actress
- Ashok Ramchandra Kelkar (born 1929), Indian writer
- Bhalchandra Vaman Kelkar (1920–1987), Indian writer and actor
- Dinkar G. Kelkar (1896–1990), Indian writer, curator, and historian
- Diwakar Krushna Kelkar (1902–1973), Indian writer
- Girijabai Kelkar (1886–1980), Indian writer and feminist
- Keerti Gaekwad Kelkar (born 21 January 1974), Indian actress
- Laxmibai Kelkar (1905–1978), Indian social reformer and independence activist
- Manisha Kelkar, Indian actress
- Manjiri Asanare–Kelkar (born 1971), Indian vocalist
- Narasimha Chintaman Kelkar (1872–1947), Indian lawyer and writer
- P. K. Kelkar (1909–1990), Indian scientist
- Sanjay Mukund Kelkar (born 1956), Indian politician
- Sharad Kelkar (born 7 October 1972), Indian actor
- Vijay Kelkar (born 1942), Indian economist and academic
- Yashwantrao Kelkar, Indian Hindutva activist

== See also ==
- P K Kelkar library or Indian Institute of Technology Kanpur, established by an Act of Parliament in 1959
- Vinayak Ganesh Vaze College of Arts, Science & Commerce (Kelkar College), Mumbai, a Mumbai University affiliated college
- Raja Dinkar Kelkar Museum, in Pune, Maharashtra, India
- Kela (disambiguation)
- Kelar
- Kelk (disambiguation)
