= Kela =

Kela or KELA may refer to:

- Kansaneläkelaitos (Kela), the Finnish social security agency
- Kellokosken Alku (KelA), a sports club in Kellokoski, Finland
- KELA (AM), a radio station (1470 AM) licensed to Centralia-Chehalis, Washington, United States
- KELA-FM, a radio station in McKenna, Washington, now known as KZTM
- Kela, tribe of West Bengal, India
- Quela (Kela), a commune in Malanje Province, Angola
- Kela, Semnan, a village in Iran
- Kela, a village in Siuntio, Finland
- Yela-Kela language, a Bantu language spoken in the Democratic Republic of Congo
- Kela language, an Austronesian language spoken on New Guinea
- Kela-2 gas field, in Xinjiang, China
- Golden Kela Awards, for the worst performances in Hindi cinema

== People with the forename Kela ==
- Kela Kvam (1931–2019), Danish academic and writer

== People with the surname Kela ==
- Adrien Kela (born 1991), New Caledonian middle-distance athlete
- Anssi Kela (born 1972), Finnish musician
- Keone Kela (born 1993), American professional baseball pitcher
- Killa Kela (born Lee Potter, 1983), English musician
- Madhusudan Kela, Indian businessman
