= Quela =

- Municipality and town
- Location in Angola
- Coordinates: 9°23′S 17°3′E
- Country: Angola
- Province: Malanje Province

Area
  - Land: 5,830 km^{2} (2,250 sq mi)

Population (2014 Census)
  - Total: 20,949
- Time zone: UTC+1 (WAT)

Quela is a town and municipality in Malanje Province in Angola. The municipality has 20,949 inhabitants in 2014. It is bounded to the north by the municipalities of Caombo and Kunda-dia-Base, to the east by the municipality of Xá-Muteba, to the south by the municipality of Cambundi-Catembo, and to the west by the municipalities of Mucari and Cuaba Nzogo. Most of the population are farmers. It comprises the four communes of Quela, Missão dos Bangalas, Xandele, and Moma. The commune of Quela has a population of about 32,000.
