= Conservation in Angola =

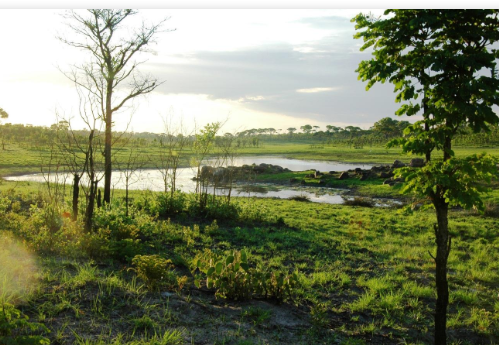
Landscape in Bicuari National Park

Conservation in Angola is centered around the protection of the country's biodiversity and natural heritage. While Angola contains a remarkably diverse array of ecosystems and species, conservation has not been a priority for most of its history. Three decades of intense conflict during the Angolan Civil War had a catastrophic effect on the nation's environment, but since the end of the war in 2002, both the Angolan government and non-state actors have gradually established programs to protect the ecological well-being of the country. However, major structural issues and lack of political will have so far kept intervention limited, and many habitats and species remain deeply threatened.

== Background ==
=== History ===
Modern conservation efforts began in 1911 under Portuguese rule when a conservation fund paid into by the sale of hunting licenses was set up; this was followed in the 1930s by the establishment of natural parks and game reserves. During the early 1970s, the colonial government greatly expanded its conservation efforts, and the outlook for Angola's ecological future looked promising. At the time of independence in 1975, about 6% of Angola's land area was officially protected. However, the outbreak of war saw functionally all conservation efforts abandoned, and formerly protected areas ceased to be managed. Poaching was rampant, especially of the country's large mammals. Infrastructural and agricultural collapse caused by the war, along with the associated mass migrations within the country, dramatically reduced the environment's capacity to sustain the nation's population.

=== Biodiversity ===
Angola is one of the most biodiverse countries in Africa, owing in large part to highly varied ecological regions within its borders. However, recent speciological data is greatly lacking, to such an extent that USAID claimed that there was less known about Angola's biodiversity in 2013 than there was in 1975. Nonetheless, a 2019 synthesis of all available data reports that the country is home to a verifiable 6,850 vascular plants, 940 bird species, 358 freshwater fish, and 291 mammal species (these numbers are expected to significantly increase as more surveys are conducted).

== Major issues ==
=== Deforestation ===
Since the end of the civil war in 2002, the rate of deforestation in Angola has been increasing. During the war, mass urbanization took place as people fled the countryside, and as a result the amount of land used for agriculture decreased. When the violence died down, hundreds of thousands of people returned to their native homes and began farming and ranching on land that the forest had begun to reclaim. This deforestation presents two major problems. First, the Guinea-Congolian forest system, of which much of Angola's forests are a part, provides carbon sequestration that is vital to efforts to reduce net greenhouse gas emissions. Second, a large portion of the population lives in rural areas and relies on subsistence, which requires a healthy and diverse ecosystem to support.

=== Threatened species ===
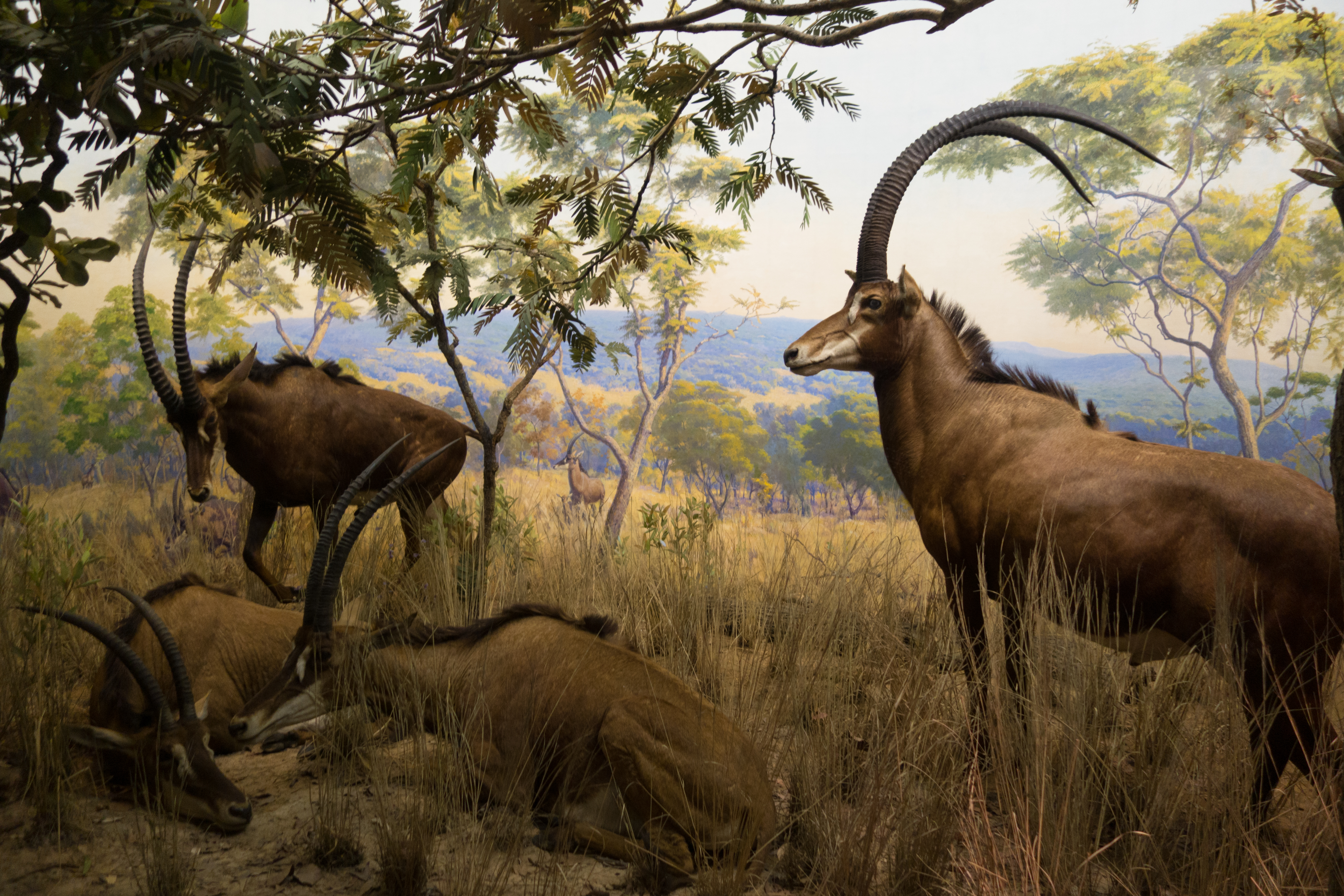
Stuffed specimen of the Giant sable antelope at the American Museum of Natural History

Angola has historically been home to a large number of African bush elephants, though their population was severely diminished during the civil war. Researchers who studied the elephant population in 2005 found their numbers to be increasing as a reasonable pace. Between 2006 and 2015, the Angolan government refused to allow surveys of elephant populations. New research conducted in 2015 revealed a 21% decline in population over the previous ten years, likely due to increased poaching and human habitat encroachment.

The giant sable antelope is a major national symbol of Angola. While it once could be found across Africa, numbers declined in the 20th century to the point that it was thought potentially extinct until one was photographed in 2004. Currently there are estimated fewer than 200 extant individuals, with habitat loss and the bushmeat trade driving this massive decline in numbers.

== Government intervention ==
Over the last decade the Angolan Ministry of Environment has begun taking steps to rebuild the country's conservation programs. They are currently working with the United Nations Environment Programme to rehabilitate coastal and wetland habitats as well as establish a sustainable chemical and waste management infrastructure. In an effort to restore their national parks system, in January 2020 Angola entered into a partnership with African Parks, a South Africa-based non-governmental organization that manages national parks in multiple African countries. However, strong concerns about governmental corruption persist, with officials in the past having sold off mining rights to protected lands and embezzled money through sham construction projects.
