= Quirima =

Town and municipality in the province of Malanje, Angola

- Municipality and town
- Location in Angola
- Coordinates: 10°54′S 18°05′E
- Country: Angola
- Province: Malanje

Area
  - Total: 10,077 km^{2} (3,891 sq mi)

Population (2014 Census)
  - Total: 21,134
  - Density: 3.6/km^{2} (9.3/sq mi)
- Time zone: UTC+1 (WAT)

Quirima (or Kirima) is a town and municipality in the province of Malanje (Malange) in Angola. It covers an area of 10,077 square kilometres (3,891 sq mi) and its population as of 2014 is 21,134 inhabitants.

== Geography ==
Quirima is bordered to the north by the municipality of Cambundi-Catembo, to the east by the municipality of Cacolo, to the south by the municipality of Cuemba, and to the west by the municipality of Luquembo.

The municipality contains the comunas (communes) of Quirima and Sauter.
