= Xandele =

- commune
- Location in Angola
- Coordinates: 9.2°S 17.3°E
- Country: Angola
- Province: Malanje
- Municipality: Quela
- Time zone: UTC+1 (WAT)

Xandele is a town and commune of Angola, located in the province of Malanje.

== See also ==
- Communes of Angola
