= Lopito Feijóo =

Lopito Feijóo (born 29 September 1963 as João André da Silva Feijó, Lombe, Malanje, Angola) is an Angolan Portuguese-speaking writer. He studied at Universidade Agostinho Neto in Luanda.

Lopito Feijóo writes poetry using novel forms. He belongs to a generation of Angolan poets whose themes "revolve around relationships, love, and the complexities of life".

He was active in organization of Angolan literary process and has been a founding member of a number of organizations including the Brigada Jovem de Literatura Angolana. He is a member of the Angolan Writers Union and the chairman of the Angolan Society of Copyright (SADIA).
