= Malanje =

- Municipality
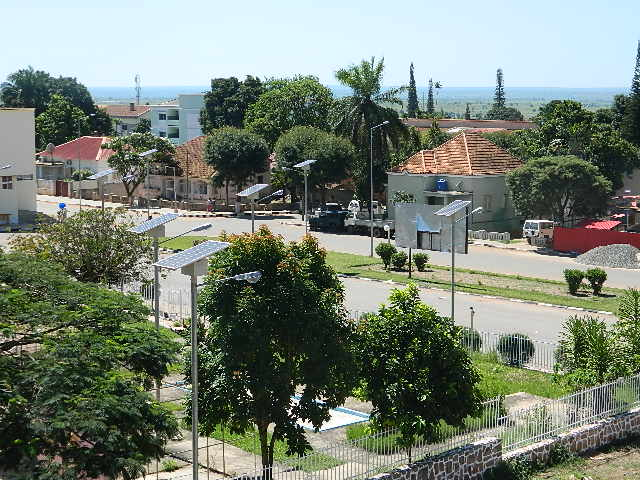

- Location in Angola
- Coordinates: 9°32′S 16°21′E
- Country: Angola
- Province: Malanje Province

Area
  - Total: 2,215 km^{2} (855 sq mi)
- Elevation: 1,155 m (3,789 ft)

Population (mid 2020)
  - Total: 604,215
  - Density: 272.8/km^{2} (706.5/sq mi)
- Time zone: UTC+1 (WAT)
- Climate: Aw

Malanje is the capital city of Malanje Province in Angola, with a population of 455,000 (2014 census), and a municipality, with a population of 506,847 (2014 census). Projected to be the thirteenth fastest growing city on the African continent between 2020 and 2025, with a 5.17% growth. It is located 380 kilometres (240 mi) east of Angola's capital Luanda. Near it are the Calandula waterfalls, the rock formations of Pungo Andongo, and the Capanda Dam. The climate is mainly humid, with average temperatures between 20 and 24 °C (68 and 75 °F) and rainfall 900 to 130 millimetres (35.4 to 5.1 in) in the rainy season (October to April).

== History ==
=== Portuguese rule ===
Portuguese settlers founded Malanje in the 19th century. The construction of the railway from Luanda to Malanje, in the fertile highlands, started in 1885. The area around Malanje included Portuguese West Africa's primary areas dedicated to the production of cotton, the crop that drove its development since the beginning. The town developed in the mid-19th century as an important slave market created in 1852. Situated at an elevation of 1,134 metres (3,720 ft), the town has a high-altitude tropical climate, ideal to several agricultural productions. The city developed as an important agricultural, manufacturing, trading and services centre. Its productions included cotton, textiles, coffee, fruit and corn. The Cangandala National Park was established by the Portuguese authorities in 1970, having previously been classified as an Integral Natural Reserve in 1963.

=== After independence from Portugal ===
The withdrawal of the Portuguese in conjunction with Angola's independence in 1975, and, later, the Angolan Civil War (1975–2002), severely hampered the production of cotton as well as that of coffee and corn (maize). Malanje was partially destroyed during the civil war, but reconstruction efforts in the years following the end of the conflict have rebuilt the city and its surroundings.

== Climate ==
Malanje has a tropical savanna climate (Köppen: Aw; Trewartha: Awbb).

Climate data for Malanje
Month	Jan	Feb	Mar	Apr	May	Jun	Jul	Aug	Sep	Oct	Nov	Dec	Year
Record high °C (°F)	32 (90)	33 (91)	32 (90)	31 (88)	31 (88)	31 (88)	32 (90)	33 (91)	32 (90)	32 (90)	31 (88)	31 (88)	33 (91)
Mean daily maximum °C (°F)	27 (81)	27 (81)	28 (82)	27 (81)	29 (84)	28 (82)	29 (84)	30 (86)	29 (84)	28 (82)	27 (81)	27 (81)	28 (82)
Daily mean °C (°F)	21 (70)	21 (70)	22 (72)	21 (70)	21 (70)	18 (64)	19 (66)	21 (70)	22 (72)	22 (72)	21 (70)	21 (70)	21 (70)
Mean daily minimum °C (°F)	16 (61)	16 (61)	16 (61)	16 (61)	13 (55)	9 (48)	9 (48)	12 (54)	15 (59)	16 (61)	16 (61)	16 (61)	14 (57)
Record low °C (°F)	13 (55)	11 (52)	8 (46)	11 (52)	4 (39)	4 (39)	2 (36)	5 (41)	10 (50)	12 (54)	11 (52)	11 (52)	2 (36)
Average precipitation mm (inches)	80 (3.1)	130 (5.1)	190 (7.5)	160 (6.3)	10 (0.4)	0 (0)	0 (0)	0 (0)	50 (2.0)	120 (4.7)	200 (7.9)	140 (5.5)	1,130 (44.5)
Source: weatherbase.com

== Landmarks ==
Near the city is the Cangandala National Park, established by the Portuguese authorities on 25 June 1970, it was founded to protect the Giant Sable Antelope which were discovered in 1963. As far as religious buildings are concerned, there is the Evangelical Church at Quêssua and as for funerary constructions, the Tomb of the queen Ana de Sousa Nzinga Mbande and the tomb of José do Telhado, a local Robin Hood. José do Telhado was a Portuguese who was exiled to Portuguese Angola that in colonial days used to steal from rich whites and distribute to poor blacks. Worth visiting is the Forte de Cabatuquila in the city.

== Transportation ==
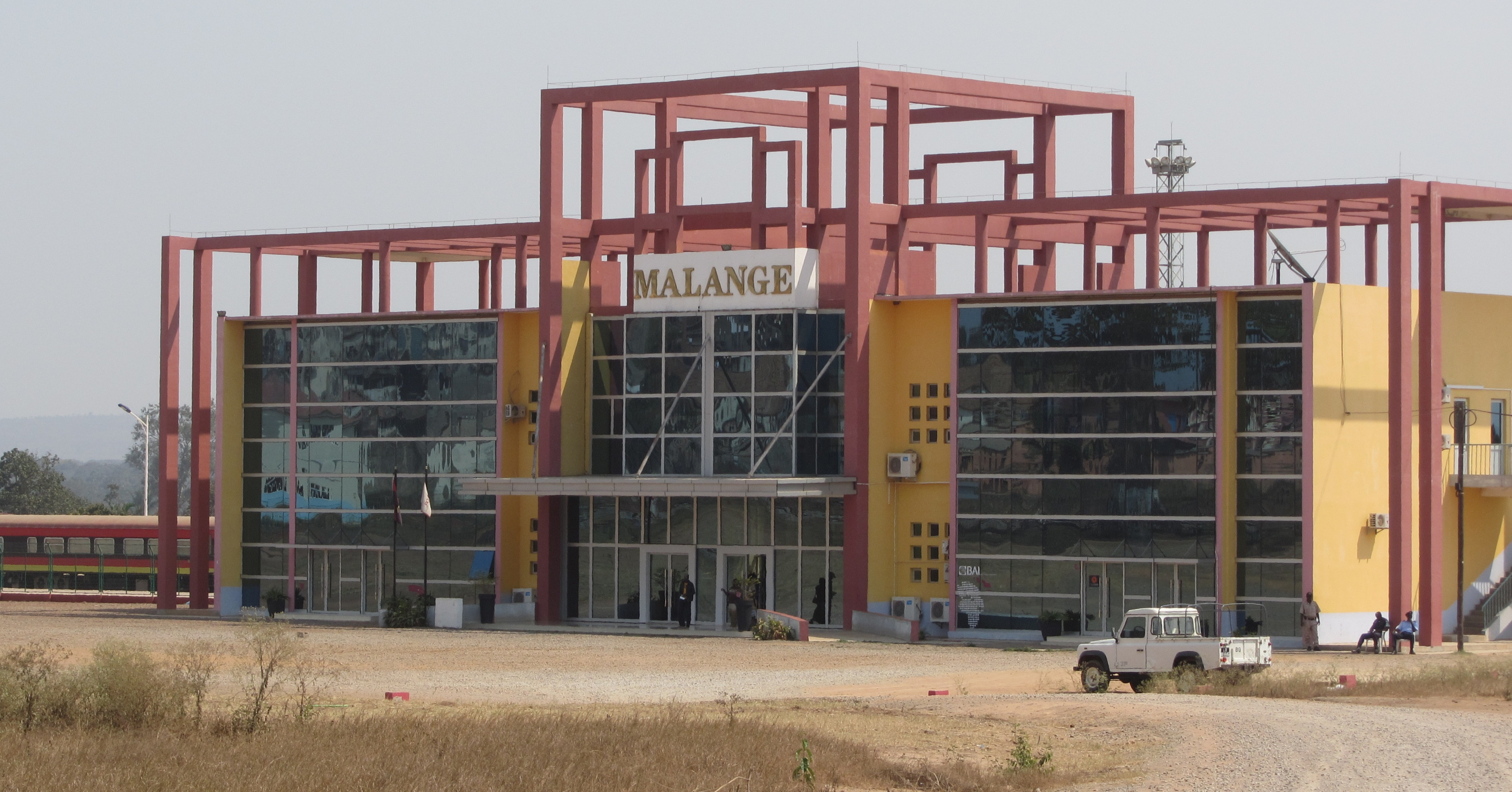
Railway station of Malanje

=== Airport ===
Malanje Airport was built during the colonial era. Currently, there are no flights to the capital Luanda.

=== Railway ===
The construction of the railway from Luanda to Malanje, in the fertile highlands, started in 1885. After the end of the civil war in 2002, it was expected to be the terminus of a railway from the capital city and port of Luanda once reconstruction was complete.

== See also ==
- Transport in Angola
