= Cangandala (commune) =

Cangandala is a commune, with a population of 32,315, and a town, with a population of 16,232 (2014 census), located in Cangandala Municipality in the Malanje Province of Angola.
