= Dinkar G. Kelkar =

Indian writer, curator and historian (1896–1990)

Dinkar Gangadhar Kelkar
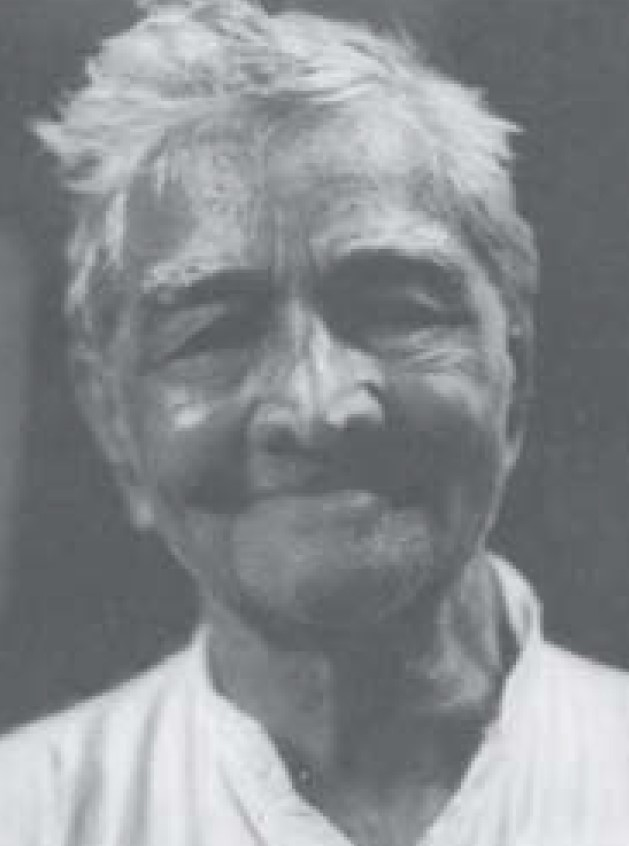
- Born: January 10, 1896
- Died: March 17, 1990 (aged 94)
- Education: Doctor of Literature and Philosophy
- Alma mater: University of Pune
- Occupations: Writer, editor, art collector, historian
- Awards: Padma Shri (1981)

Dinkar Gangadhar Kelkar (January 10, 1896 – March 17, 1990) was an Indian writer, editor, art collector and historian. He is best remembered for establishing the Raja Dinkar Kelkar Museum in Pune.

== Biography ==
Born on January 10, 1896, into the Chitpavan Brahmin Kelkar gharana of Kasarveli, to Gangadhar and Uma Kelkar (née Karve), Kelkar was the youngest of four sons.

Beginning in 1915, Kelkar began publishing books of poetry titled Adnyatvasi (Marathi: अज्ञातवासी; lit. transl. Anonymous) in parts one through three. In the 1950s, they were included as reference texts for the University of Bombay's Bachelor of Arts degree. He would also go on to edit part of the second anthology of Bhaskar Ramchandra Tambe's poems in 1935, and would also go on to edit Pralhad Keshav Atre's poem Zenduchi Phule. He was also one of the founders of the Sharda Mandir High School in Mumbai.

In the 1920s, Kelkar began an extensive historical collection of photographs, books, paintings, carvings, textiles, manuscripts, almanacs, toys, puppets, letters, scrolls, scriptures, weaponry, instruments, carpets, metallic works, furnishings and fixtures. He established the Raja Dinkar Kelkar Museum in Pune for the display of these artifacts. He named the museum after his deceased son. He served as the museums's director until the Government of Maharashtra took over management of the museum in April 1985.

In 1978, Kelkar acquired a Doctor of Literature and Philosophy degree from the University of Pune and was a member of the Indian Institute of Architects. He was awarded the Padma Shri by the Government of India in 1981 for his contributions in the field of Science & Engineering. He was also the recipient of an award by the Indian Centre for Excellence, and briefly worked as the chief curator at Salar Jung Museum in Hyderabad.

Kelkar died on March 17, 1990. He had married Kamala (née Sitabai Ukidwe) and the couple had had a daughter, Jayaprabha (married name Rekha Ranade) and a son, Raja (1932–1941). Kelkar was a distant cousin of P. K. Kelkar who belonged to the same gharana, and was also a distant relative of Panditrao and Dnyaneshwar Agashe through their mother.

== List of works ==
=== As writer ===
- Adnyatvasi (1915) [Parts 1, 2, 3]

=== As editor ===
- Tambe Yanche Samagra Kavita (1935), an anthology of Bhaskar Ramchandra Tambe's poems, by Dr. Madhavrao Patwardhan
- Zenduchi Phule (1969) by Pralhad Keshav Atre
