= Malanje Airport =

Malanje Airport Malange Airport
- IATA: MEG; ICAO: FNMA

Summary
- Airport type: Public
- Operator: Government
- Location: Malanje, Angola
- Elevation AMSL: 3,868 ft / 1,179 m
- Coordinates: 9°31′30″S 16°18′45″E

Map
- Location of Airport in Angola

Runways
Direction	Length		Surface
Direction	m	ft	Surface
13/31	2,220	7,283	Asphalt
- Source: WAD GCM Landings.com Google Maps

Malanje Airport (IATA: MEG, ICAO: FNMA) is an airport serving Malanje, the capital of Malanje Province in Angola.

The Malange non-directional beacon (Ident: MA) is 5 kilometres (3.1 mi) east of the airport, and serves as a radio transmitter to crafts coming and going.

== See also ==
- List of airports in Angola
- Transport in Angola
