= Lucala River =

River in Angola

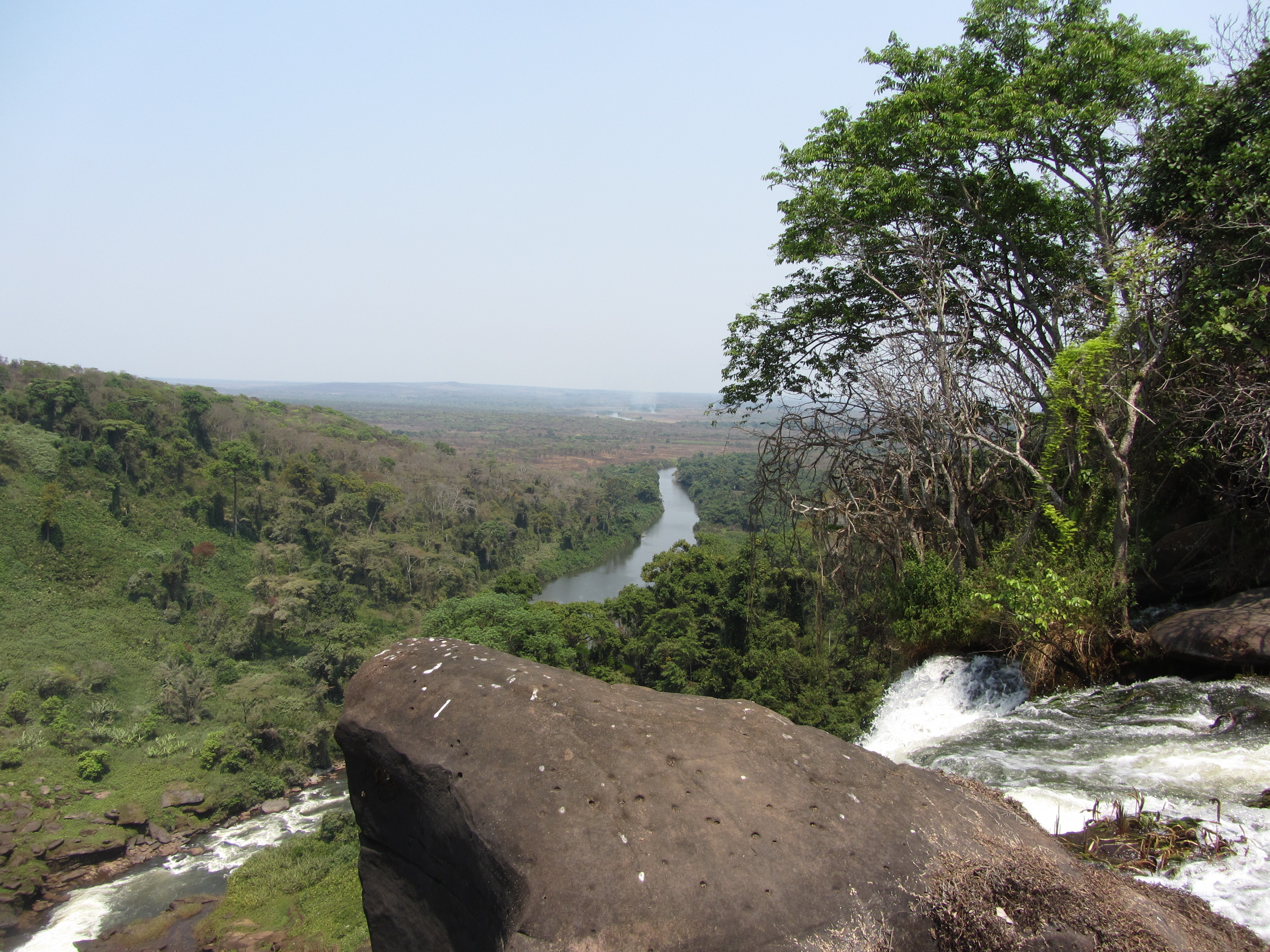
- The Lucala River leaving the valley created by the Kalandula Falls

- Location within Angola

Physical characteristics
- Source
  - location: Uíge Province
- Mouth: Cuanza River
  - location: Cuanza Norte Province
  - coordinates: 9°37′41.46″S 14°14′11.73″E

Basin features
- Waterfalls: Kalandula Falls

The Lucala River is a river in Angola, a right tributary of Angola's largest river, the Cuanza River.

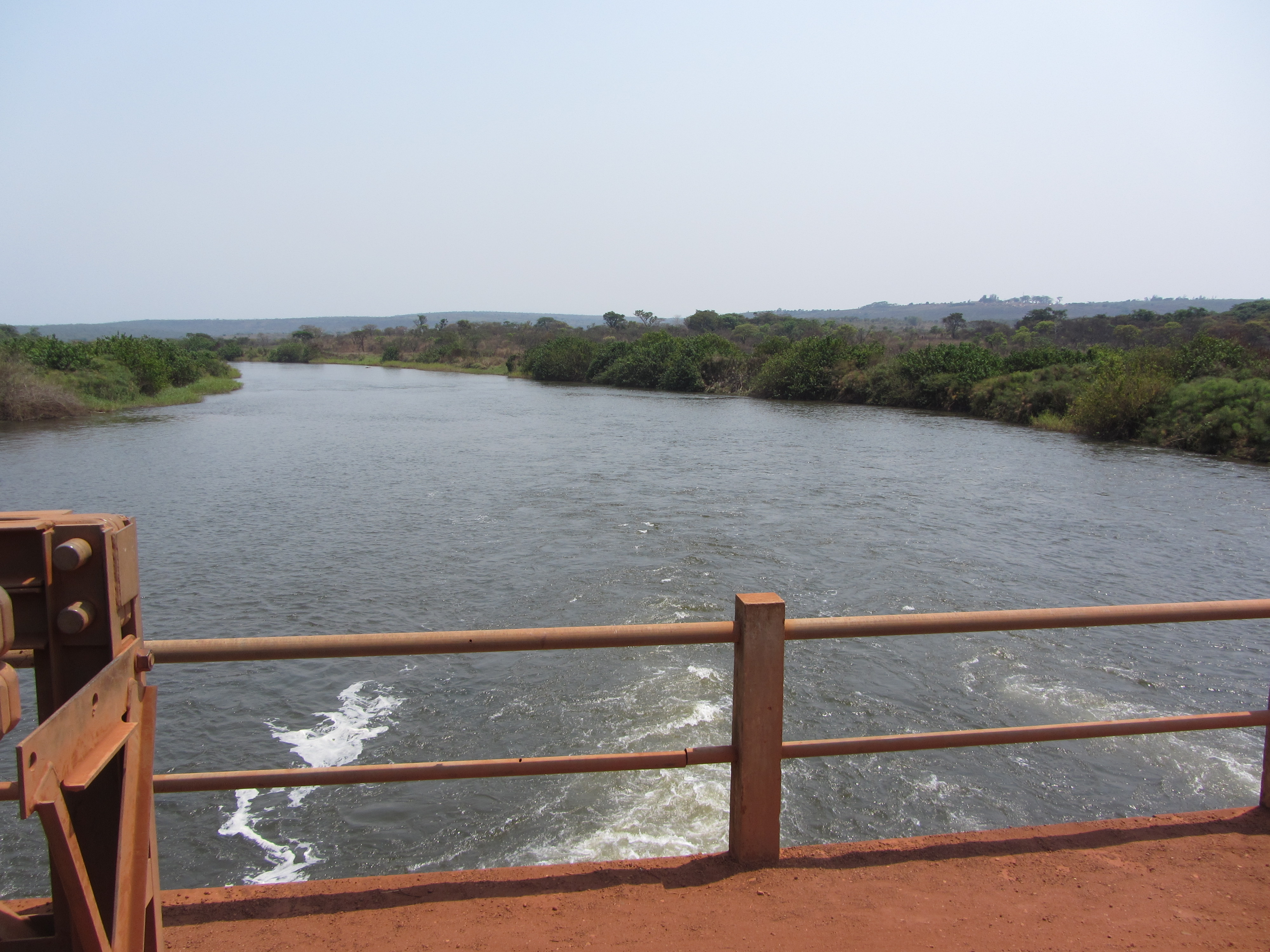
Further down from the falls, crossing the Luije-Kalandula road

The Lucala has its source in Uíge Province, runs through Malanje Province, where it feeds the Kalandula Falls, and finally empties into the Cuanza River near Massangano in Cuanza Norte Province, some kilometers downstream of Dondo.
