= Pungo-Andongo =

Pungo-Andongo Pedras Negras
- commune
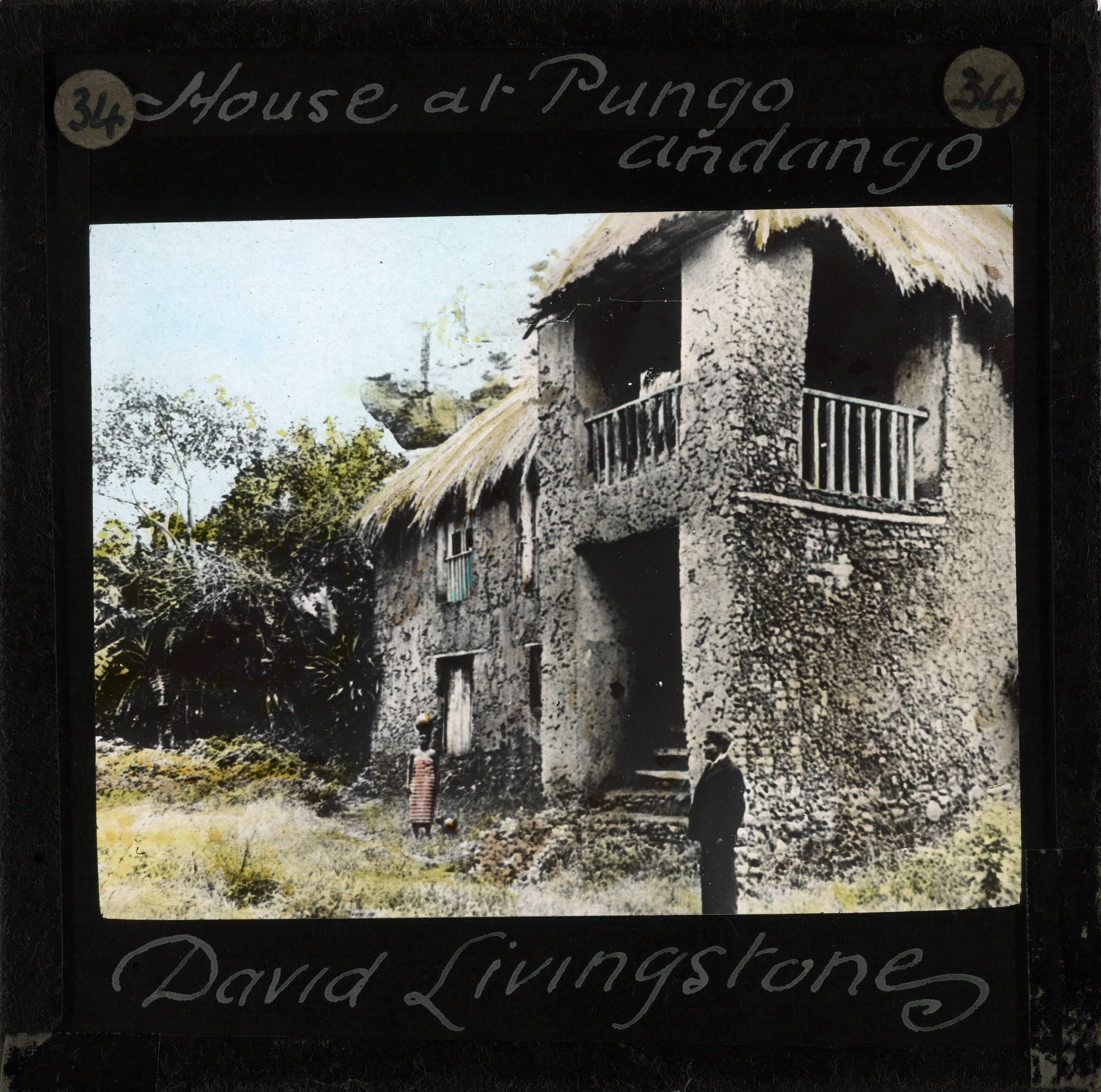
- House at Pungo Andongo, (ca.1875-1940)

- Location in Angola
- Country: Angola
- Province: Malanje
- Time zone: UTC+1 (WAT)

Pungo-Andongo is a town and commune of Angola, located in the province of Malanje.

Pungo Andongo was the capital of the Kingdom of Ndongo during its decline. In 1671 the Portuguese besieged and captured the city, enslaving many of its inhabitants and destroying the kingdom. The ruins of the Fortress of Pungo-Andongo, built by the Portuguese after the battle, are located in the modern town.

== See also ==
- Black Rocks at Pungo Andongo
