= Black Rocks at Pungo Andongo =

Monolithic rock formations in Angola

Black Rocks at Pungo Andongo Portuguese: Pedras Negras de Pungo Andongo
- Monolithic rock formations
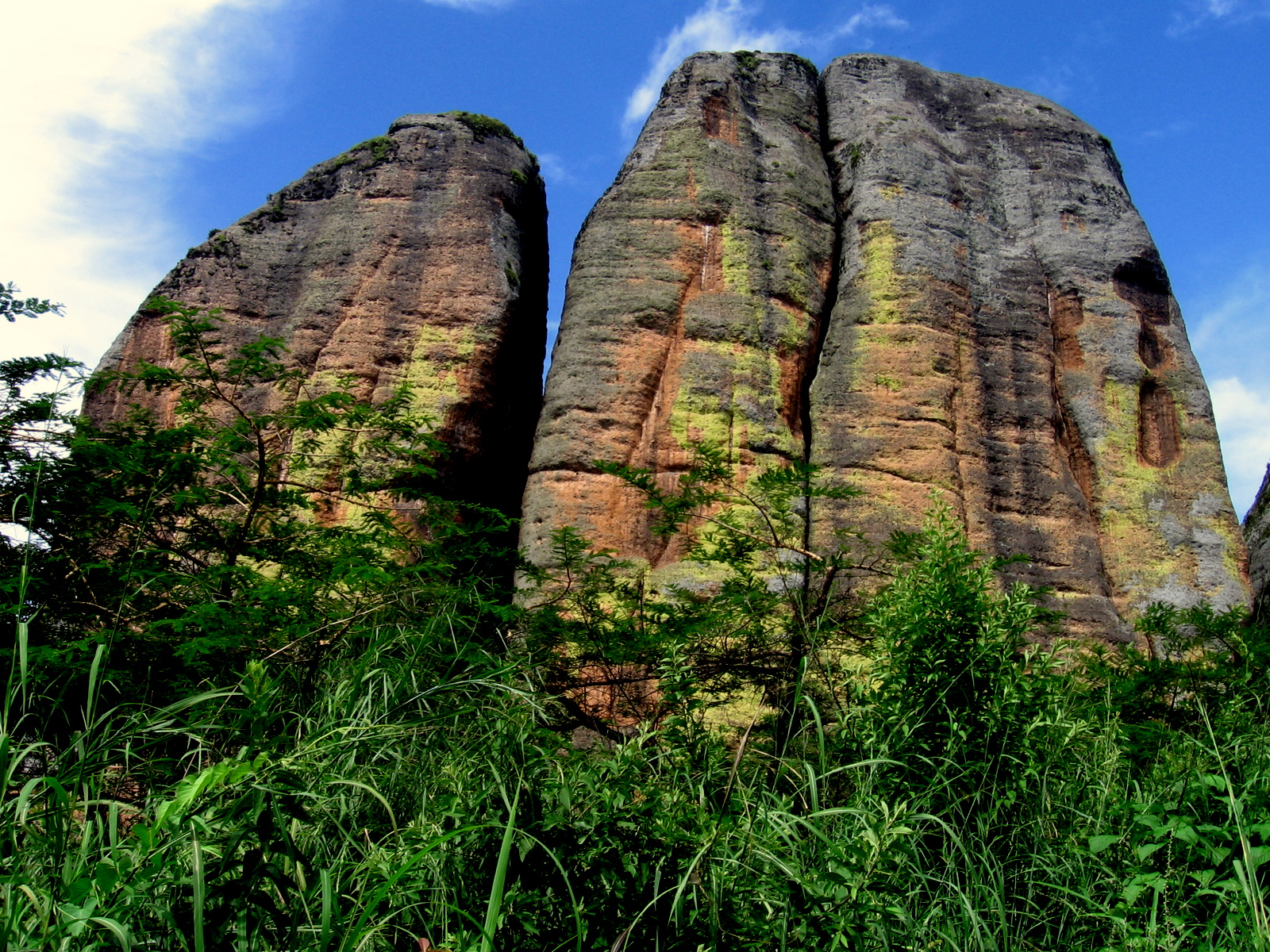

- Location within Angola
- Coordinates: 9°39′45″S 15°35′02″E
- Location: Malanje Province, Angola
- Part of: Cacuso Plateau

The Black Rocks at Pungo Andongo (Pedras Negras de Pungo Andongo) are a set of extensive monolithic rock formations in Angola. Millions of years old, they stand out for their size in relation to the savanna landscape of the region. It is subdivided into Western, South, North and Southeast subsystems. The formation is an extension of the Cacuso Plateau.

The western rocky subsystem, the best known and most visited of all, is located in the municipality of Cacuso, in Malanje Province, and is an important tourist attraction in Angola.

According to tradition, the footprints carved into the rock belong to Ana de Sousa Ginga of Ndongo and Matamba, the great monarch of the kingdom of Ndongo.

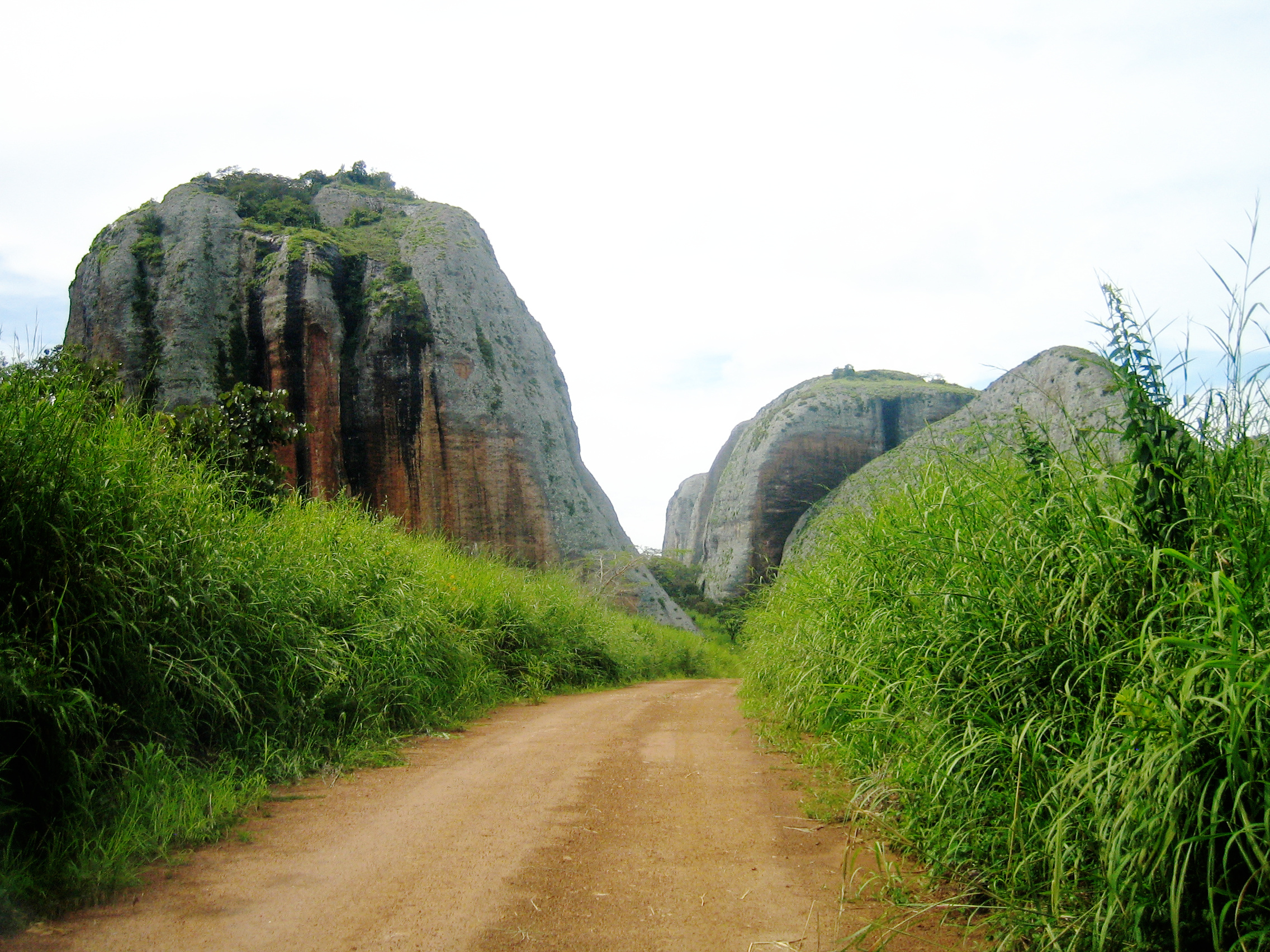
Black Rocks at Pungo Andongo

The commune of Pungo-Andongo is located in the center of the western subsystem of the formation. During its last years, this town was the capital of the Kingdom of Ndongo. In 1671 the Portuguese besieged and captured the city, enslaving many of its inhabitants and destroying the kingdom. The ruins of the Fortress of Pungo-Andongo, built by the Portuguese after the battle, are located in the modern town.
