= Cambundi-Catembo =

- Municipality & town
- Location in Angola
- Coordinates: 10°4′32″S 17°33′25″E
- Country: Angola
- Province: Malanje Province

Area
  - Municipality & town: 5,200 sq mi (13,400 km^{2})

Population (2022 urban population 2014)
  - Municipality & town: 58,581
  - Density: 11.3/sq mi (4.37/km^{2})
  - Urban: 17,212
- Time zone: UTC+1 (WAT)
- Climate: Aw

Cambundi-Catembo (pre-1975: Nova Gaia) is a town and municipality, with a population of 46,312 (2014 census), in Malanje Province in Angola. The municipality consists of four communes Cambundi-Catembo (commune), Dumba Cambango, Quitapa and Tala Mungongo.
