= Tembo-Aluma =

- commune
- Location in Angola
- Coordinates: 7°42′S 17°16′E
- Country: Angola
- Province: Malanje
- Time zone: UTC+1 (WAT)

Tembo-Aluma is a town and commune of Angola, located in the province of Malanje.

== See also ==
- Communes of Angola
