= Mufuma =

- commune
- Country: Angola
- Province: Malanje
- Time zone: UTC+1 (WAT)

Mufuma is a town and commune of Angola, located in the province of Malanje.

== See also ==
- Communes of Angola
