= Calandula =

Calandula Kalandula
- Municipality and town
- Location in Angola
- Coordinates: 9°05′22″S 15°57′18″E
- Country: Angola
- Province: Malanje Province

Population (2014 Census)
  - Municipality and town: 101,703
  - Urban: 9,000
- Time zone: UTC+1 (WAT)

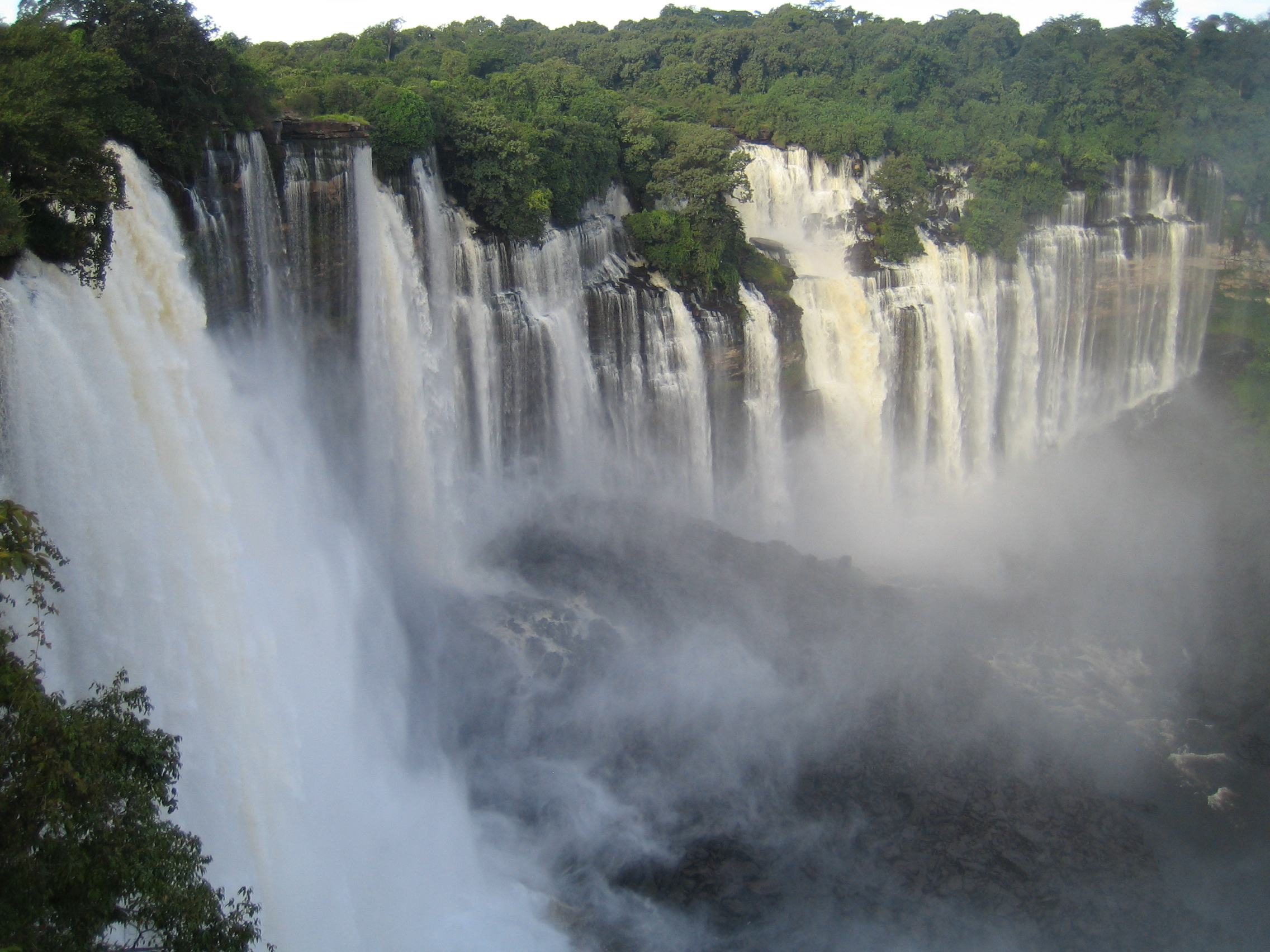
Kalandula waterfalls of Lucala river, Malanje, Angola

Calandula (pre-1975: Duque de Bragança), also spelled Kalandula is a town and municipality in Malanje Province in Angola. The municipality had a population of 80,415 in 2014.

== See also ==
- Kalandula Falls
