= Moma, Angola =

Moma
- commune
- Country: Angola
- Province: Malanje
- Time zone: UTC+1 (WAT)

Moma is a town and commune of Angola, located in the province of Malanje. The census in 2014 showed a population of 2,187 people, with the commune covering an area of 1100 km^{2}.

== See also ==
- Communes of Angola
