= Quimbango =

- Commune
- Country: Angola
- Province: Malanje
- Time zone: UTC+1 (WAT)

Quimbango is a commune of Angola, located in the province of Malanje.
