= Massango =

- Municipality and town
- Location in Angola
- Coordinates: 11°19′S 14°56′E
- Country: Angola
- Province: Malanje Province

Population (2014 Census)
  - Total: 32,918
- Time zone: UTC+1 (WAT)
- Climate: Aw

Massango is a town and municipality in Malanje Province in Angola. The municipality has a population of 32,918 in 2014.
