= Cabombo-Lumai =

Coordinates: 13°16′S 21°12′E

- commune
- Location in Angola
- Country: Angola
- Province: Malanje
- Time zone: UTC+1 (WAT)

Cabombo-Lumai is a town and commune of Angola, located in the province of Malanje.

== See also ==
- Communes of Angola
