= Kateco-Kangola =

Coordinates: 8°28′S 15°50′E

- commune
- Location in Angola
- Country: Angola
- Province: Malanje
- Time zone: UTC+1 (WAT)

Kateco-Kangola is a town and commune of Angola, located in the province of Malanje.

== See also ==
- Communes of Angola
