= Marimba, Angola =

Marimba
- Municipality and town
- Location in Angola
- Coordinates: 8°22′S 17°1′E
- Country: Angola
- Province: Malanje Province

Population (2014 Census)
  - Total: 26,180
- Time zone: UTC+1 (WAT)

Marimba is a town and municipality in Malanje Province in Angola. The municipality had a population of 26,180 in 2014.
