= Kela Kvam =

Danish academic and writer (1931–2019)

- Born: Kela Beate Kvam; 16 April 1931; Copenhagen, Denmark
- Died: 14 July 2019 (aged 88); Denmark
- Education: University of Copenhagen
- Occupations: Academic; Writer
- Employers: Odense University (1967–1974); University of Copenhagen (1974–2001)
- Spouse: Ragnar K. (m. 1960)
- Children: 2
- Awards: Knight of the Order of the Dannebrog

Kela Beate Kvam (16 April 1931 – 14 July 2019) was a Danish academic and writer. She was employed as an associate professor at the Nordic Institute at Odense University from 1967 to 1974 and was later working as the first female professor of theatre studies at her alma mater, the University of Copenhagen, between 1974 and 2001. Kvam oversaw the creation of the Documentation Centre for Nordic Group Theatre that sought to get political theatre movement material and involved her students in working and gathering source material. She contributed to collections such as the Dansk kvindebiografisk leksikon, co-edited and co-authored the two-volume Dansk Teaterhistorie, and established the Nordic Theatre Studies journal of which she was its editor-in-chief. Kvam was appointed Knight of the Order of the Dannebrog in 1988.

== Early life ==
On 16 April 1931, Kvam was born in Copenhagen, Denmark, to the editor Mogens Nyholm and Karen Kirchhoff-Larsen. She graduated from Christianshavns Gymnasium in 1949 and thereafter enrolled at the University of Copenhagen to study art history, comparative and ordinary history as well as English. In 1958, Kvam earned her Magister degree in comparative and ordinary history, with her dissertation called Henrik Ibsen on the French Stage that she finished during a one year when she was studying in Paris a year earlier. She became employed at the Royal Library, Denmark, and got an master's degree in the aesthetics and theatre with a dissertation called Strindberg and Intima Teatern in 1965.

== Career ==
Kvam was employed at Odense University at its Nordic Institute as an associate professor, between 1967 and 1974. She established four Nordic group theatre festivals and seminars in close collaboration with students that ran from 1973 to 1977. In 1974, Kvam was appointed the first female professor of theatre studies at the University of Copenhagen. She oversaw the creation of the Documentation Centre for Nordic Group Theatre, which during the mid-1970s to the mid-1980s, sought to obtain material from the political theatre movement such as interviews, photographs and performances recorded on cassette tapes for their archives. She asked her students to produce radio and television programmes for school pupils and to organise exhibitions, festivals, international guest performances and lectures to organisations. Kvam and a group of students met the recently released Nigerian playwright Wole Soyinka for a film project in the late 1970s.

From 1980 to 1984, she was a member of the Teaterrådet and able to influence the distribution of theatre grants. Kvam was a member on the committee which was revising the Theatre Act under the Ministry of Culture between 1985 and 1988. She served as a member of the Teaterrådet's contract committee from 1991 to 1994. In 1988, Kvam founded the journal Nordic Theatre Studies, serving as its editor in chief from 1989 to 1992. She co-edited and co-contributed to Dansk Teaterhistorie, a two-volume edition published between 1992 and 1993, and was an employee working on the fifth to seventh volumes of Gyldendals World Literary History. Kvam published Betty Nansen, The Mask and Man in 1997 in which she described the analysis of the interpretations of the roles played by Betty Nansen.

She was a founder member of the Association for Nordic Theatre Scholars (Nordiske Teaterforskere) in 1998 and contributed to the Dansk kvindebiografisk leksikon as a subject consultant from 2000 to 2001. Kvam retired from the University of Copenhagen in 2001. Six years later, she was a contributor to Gyldendals Teaterleksikon. Kvam authored an essay on research about The Federal Theatre under the New Deal which was published in the daily newspaper Dagbladet Information in 2013.

== Personal life ==
She was married to the editor Ragnar K. on 6 September 1960, with whom she had two children. In 1988, Kvam was appointed Knight of the Order of the Dannebrog. She died on 14 July 2019. A memorial service was held for Kvam at Helge, Dagmarsgade in Copenhagen on the afternoon of 28 July.

== Analysis and legacy ==
Karen Vedel and Stig Jarl noted her "teaching was largely tied to her research and she involved her students not only in working with source material, but also in collecting and generating data." Jarl observed that Kvam was "concerned with the relationship between the theoretical theater science and the living theater and would have liked to see a greater collaboration between the theater science and the theater artistic educations." Erhard Jakobsen, the founder of the Centre Democrats political party, called Kvam "the fox-red professor".
