= Tala Mungongo =

Coordinates: 9°43′S 17°14′E

- commune
- Location in Angola
- Country: Angola
- Province: Malanje
- Time zone: UTC+1 (WAT)

Tala Mungongo is a town and commune of Angola, located in the province of Malanje.

== See also ==
- Communes of Angola
