= Caombo =

- Municipality and town
- Location in Angola
- Coordinates: 8°42′S 16°31′E
- Country: Angola
- Province: Malanje Province

Population (2014 Census)
  - Total: 21,511
- Time zone: UTC+1 (WAT)
- Climate: Aw

Caombo or Cahombo is a town and municipality in Malanje Province in Angola. The municipality had a population of 21,511 in 2014.
