= Cangandala National Park =

National Park of Angola

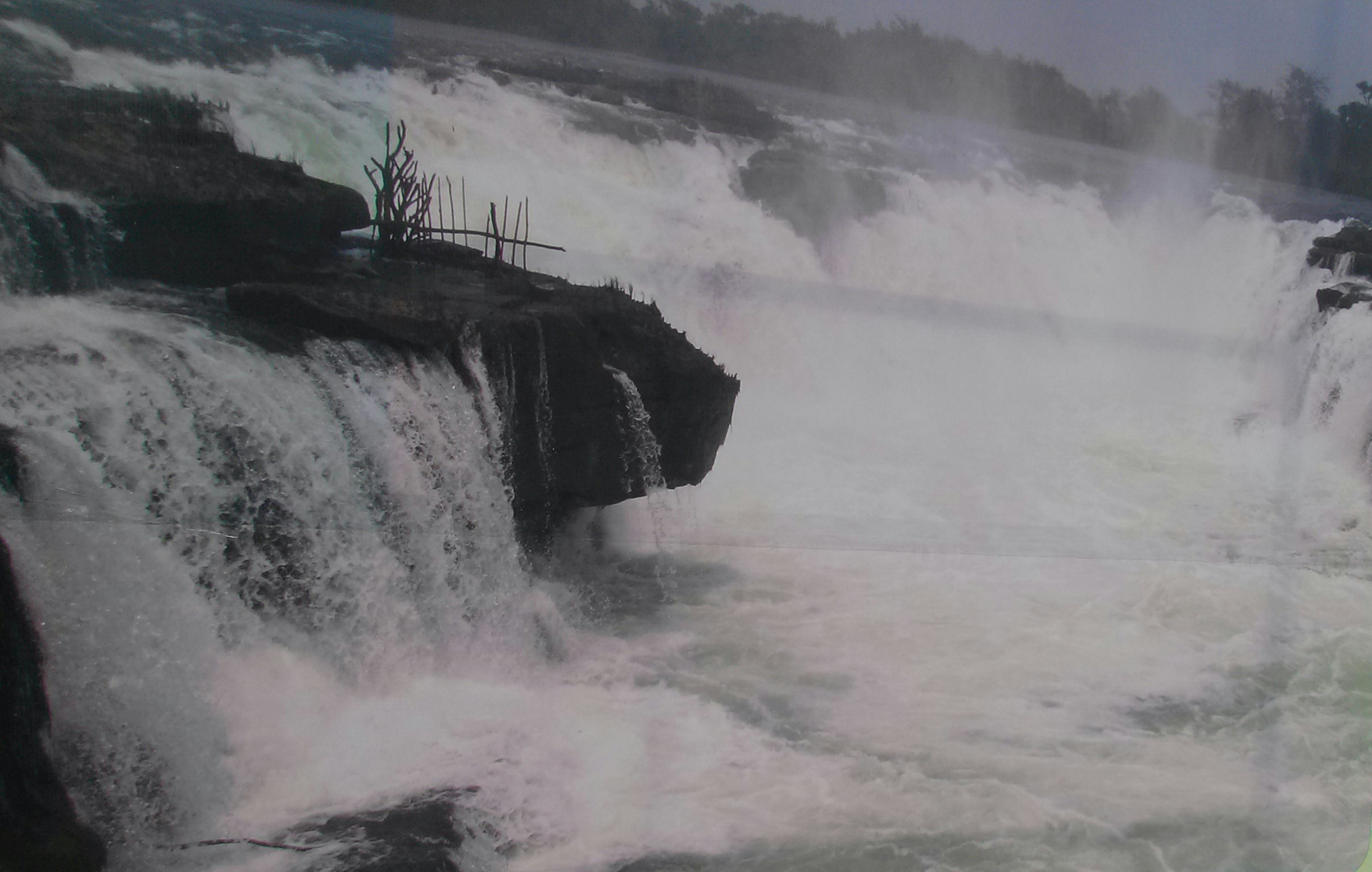
- Waterfalls in Cangandala

- Location within Angola
- Coordinates: 9.8°S 16.75°E
- Area: 600 km^{2} (230 sq mi)
- Established: 1963

Cangandala National Park is a national park in Malanje Province, Angola. It is situated between the Cuanza, and two of its tributaries, the Maúndo and Cuije rivers.

== History ==
Cangandala National Park was established in 1970 by the Angolan government to protect the critically endangered Giant sable antelope (Hippotragus niger variani). The park was created specifically to safeguard the last remaining wild populations of this subspecies in Angola. The park's history is deeply intertwined with Angola's tumultuous past, particularly the Angolan Civil War (1975-2002). During the conflict, the giant sable population suffered devastating declines due to poaching and habitat disruption, leading to fears of its extinction. After the war ended in 2002, significant conservation efforts were launched to protect the remaining individuals and support the recovery of the species. These efforts included establishing a highly protected sanctuary within the park.

== Geography ==
Cangandala National Park is located in Malanje Province, Angola. It is situated between the Cuanza River and two of its tributaries, the Maúndo and Cuije rivers. The park is spread over an area of 630 km^{2} (240 sq mi). The topography of the National Park is primarily characterized by a flat to undulating landscape, typical of the Angolan savanna biome. The climate in this region of Angola is generally tropical, with distinct wet and dry seasons.

== Biodiversity ==
The park's terrain consists mainly of open woodlands and grasslands (miombo woodlands), interspersed with some dense forest patches along river courses. The presence of the Cuanza River and its tributaries, the Maúndo and Cuije rivers, influences the local topography, creating riverine habitats and seasonal wetlands. Forest vegetation is dominated by Brachystegia and Julbernardia, together with other trees in places (Piliostigma, Burkea, Monotes, Strychnos, Sterculia and Dombeya). Apart from the giant sable, the park's miombo woodlands and grasslands support a variety of other wildlife. This includes various species of antelopes, zebras, and numerous bird species that inhabit the savanna and wetland areas.
