= Deforestation in Angola =

Conversion of forest to non-forest for human use in Angola

Annually, Angola loses about 124,800 hectares or 0.20% per year. In 1990–2010, the country had lost about 2,496,000 hectares or 4.1% in total.

Angola had a 2018 Forest Landscape Integrity Index mean score of 8.35/10, ranking it 23rd globally out of 172 countries.

== History ==
Angola did the first inventory of its forest in 2008 with 199 samples.

== Region ==
The provinces of Cabinda, Cuando Cubango, Moxico and Uíge have the highest level of forest exploitation for timber production.

== Tree cover extent and loss ==
Global Forest Watch publishes annual estimates of tree cover loss and 2000 tree cover extent derived from time-series analysis of Landsat satellite imagery in the Global Forest Change dataset. In this framework, tree cover refers to vegetation taller than 5 m (including natural forests and tree plantations), and tree cover loss is defined as the complete removal of tree cover canopy for a given year, regardless of cause.

For Angola, country statistics report cumulative tree cover loss of 4,230,235 ha (42,302.35 km^{2}) from 2001 to 2024 (about 7.7% of its 2000 tree cover area). For tree cover density greater than 30%, country statistics report a 2000 tree cover extent of 55,276,135 ha (552,761.35 km^{2}). The charts and table below display this data. In simple terms, the annual loss number is the area where tree cover disappeared in that year, and the extent number shows what remains of the 2000 tree cover baseline after subtracting cumulative loss. Forest regrowth is not included in the dataset.

Annual tree cover loss in Angola, 2001–2024. View chart definition.
Tree cover extent in 2000 minus cumulative tree cover loss in Angola, 2001–2024 (loss-only residual; does not account for gain). View chart definition.

Annual tree cover extent and loss
Year	Tree cover extent (km2) (Note: This residual measure does not include forest regrowth.)	Annual tree cover loss (km2)
2001	551,749.17	1,012.18
2002	551,139.09	610.08
2003	550,614.45	524.64
2004	549,901.72	712.73
2005	548,967.34	934.38
2006	548,197.98	769.36
2007	546,745.10	1,452.88
2008	545,709.53	1,035.57
2009	544,050.49	1,659.04
2010	542,452.49	1,598.00
2011	540,623.40	1,829.09
2012	538,815.93	1,807.47
2013	537,127.56	1,688.37
2014	535,000.99	2,126.57
2015	533,383.87	1,617.12
2016	531,086.97	2,296.90
2017	528,282.75	2,804.22
2018	525,857.53	2,425.22
2019	524,106.76	1,750.77
2020	521,626.97	2,479.79
2021	518,644.34	2,982.63
2022	515,975.18	2,669.16
2023	513,292.40	2,682.78
2024	510,459.00	2,833.40
