= Cunda-Dia-Baze =

- Municipality and town
- Location in Angola
- Coordinates: 8°55′S 17°4′E
- Country: Angola
- Province: Malanje Province

Population (2014 Census)
  - Total: 12,620
- Time zone: UTC+1 (WAT)

Cunda-Dia-Baze is a town and municipality in Malanje Province in Angola. The municipality had a population of 12,620 in 2014.
