= Battle of Pungo Andongo =

- Part of the Angolan Wars
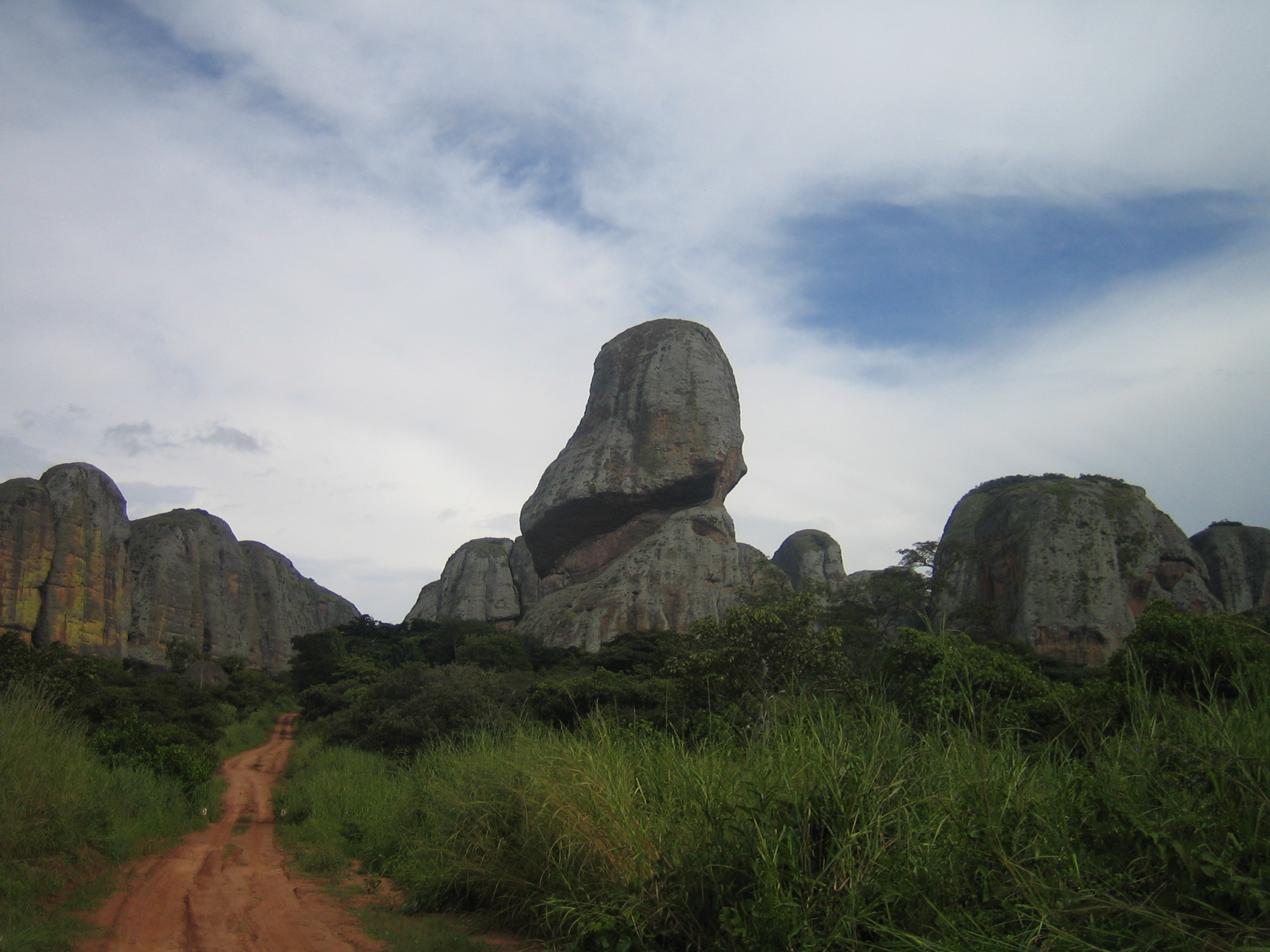
- Rocky outcrops in the vicinity of Pungo Andongo
| Date | February 1671 – 18 November 1671 |
| Location | Pungo Andongo |
| Result | Portuguese victory. |
| Territorial changes | Pungo Andongo occupied.; Kingdom of Ndongo annexed into the empire. |

Belligerents
| Portugal | Kingdom of Ndongo |

Commanders and leaders
| Luís Lopes de Sequeira | Dom João Hari: Dom Diogo Cabanga |

Strength
| Unknown | Unknown |

Casualties and losses
| Unknown | Unknown |

The battle of Pungo Andongo (also known as the siege of Pungo Andongo or the battle of Mpungu-a-Ndongo), was a military engagement in what is today Angola between Portugal and the Kingdom of Ndongo (Andongo in Portuguese) whose capital, Pungo Andongo, also known as Pedras Negras, was besieged. After a 9-month long encirclement, the capital was taken by storm, plundered, and occupied by the Portuguese.

The entire royal family of Ndongo was captured, and the Portuguese built a fort on Pungo Andongo. The Kingdom of Ndongo therefore ceased to exist.

== Background ==
In 1670, the Portuguese were routed at the Battle of Kitombo by the forces of the Count of Soyo Estevão da Silva, supported by the Dutch. Meanwhile, pro-Portuguese King Luís was driven from the throne of Kitombo by a rival, Dom António Carrasco, who likewise slaughtered the Portuguese in the settlement.

Encouraged by such setbacks, the King of Ndongo, Dom João Hari (Ngola Hari), took the opportunity to revolt against Portuguese suzerainty, cut all communications between Luanda and the Portuguese-allied Kingdom of Cassanje and attacked Portuguese trade caravans. He dispatched envoys to a number of neighbouring chiefdoms, among them the kingdom of Matamba, seeking to rally them to his cause against the Portuguese.

The then Portuguese governor of Angola, Francisco de Távora, reacted to these events accordingly, requesting reinforcements from Portuguese Brazil, and quickly dispatching to the Portuguese fort at Ambaca a small forward contingent under the command of Luís Lopes de Sequeira, who had previously distinguished himself at the Battle of Mbwila. Skirmishes between the Portuguese and the forces of Andongo had already taken place before a large Portuguese fleet arrived in Luanda, bringing significant reinforcements from Brazil. At the same time, as many Portuguese soldiers and Imbangala mercenaries as possible were assembled from the garrisons at Ilamba, Lumbo, Massangano, Cambambe, Muxima and elsewhere. The campaign was to be the largest military campaign the Portuguese had yet undertaken in Angola.

== The siege ==
The Portuguese marched their forces from Ambaca to Pungo Andongo on August 2, under constant harassment by African skirmishes, who sought to prevent the Europeans from closing in on the stronghold. Sequeira nevertheless managed to reach the settlement and set up camp in its vicinity. All attempts at diplomatic talks were met with vigorous and violent rejection by the besieged, hence the Portuguese initiated the construction of siege-works in expectation for a drawn-out siege, digging trenches and erecting barricades, while the forces of Andongo frequently conducted sallies against them.

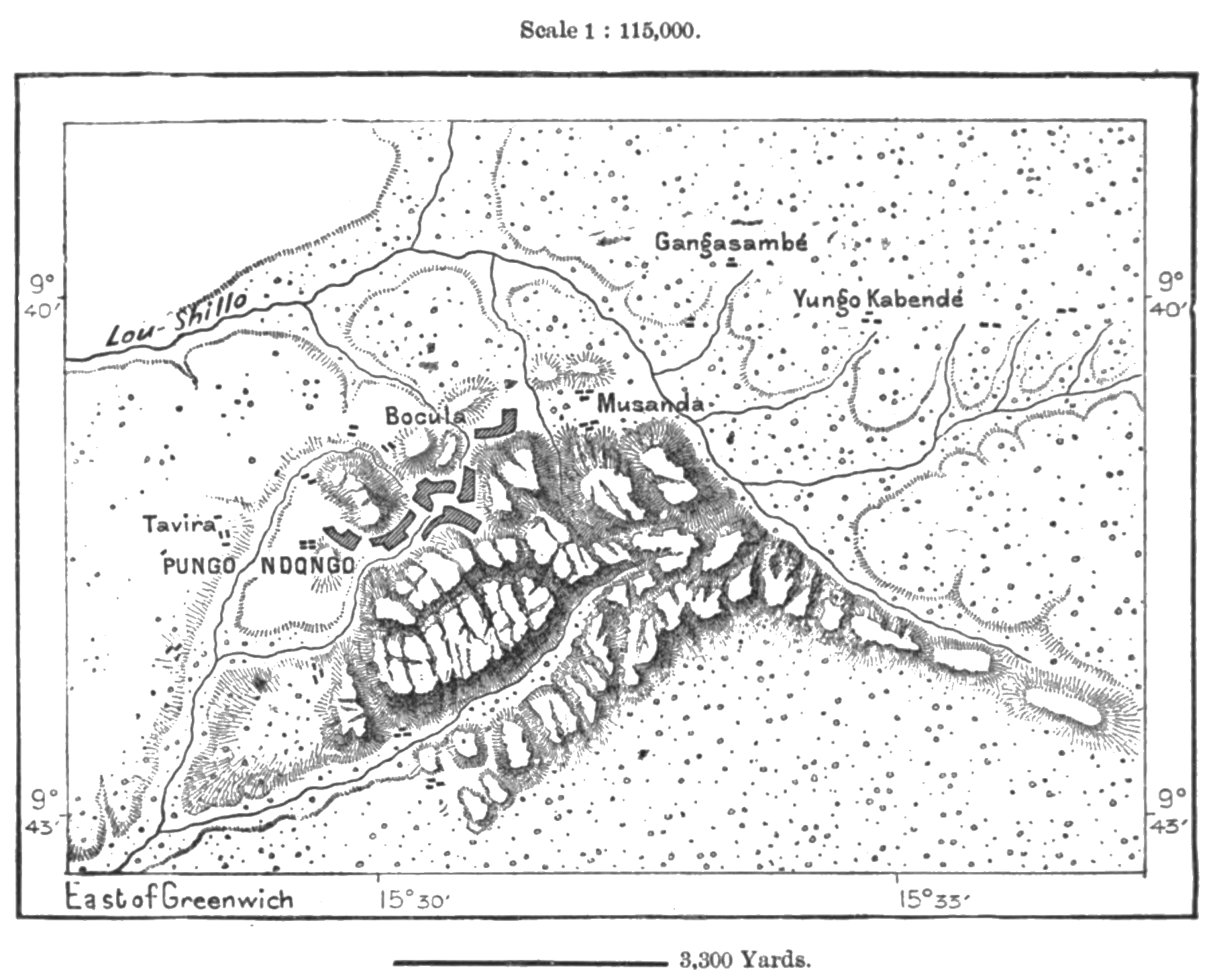
Black Stones of Pungo Andongo, 19th century map.

On August 27 1671, a particularly vigorous attack commanded by Dom Diogo Cabanga, brother of the king of Andongo, on Portuguese lines was repulsed by small arms and cannon fire. As Portuguese reinforcements flowed in to their camp from Luanda, king João sent a gift of slaves to the Portuguese commander, and proposed to give himself in after the siege had been lifted; the siege was not lifted, but the king was informed he would be treated mercifully if he surrendered. This message went unanswered.

As reports reached Sequeira that Matamba was preparing a large relief force, he ordered that Pungo Andongo be taken by storm as soon as possible. Thus on the night of November 18 the Portuguese scaled the rocky outcrops surrounding the fortified settlement under cover of the darkness; the first to breach the fortified perimeter was captain Manuel Nunes Cortês, at the head of a party of African auxiliaries. A violent melee ensured, but the settlement was eventually subdued. Many died in the fight and ensuing plunder, some jumping from the high cliffs to escape capture by the Portuguese.

== Aftermath ==
The Portuguese took many prisoners, among them many nobles and the entire royal family of Andongo. King João Hari had fled to Libolo, but he was captured and delivered to the Portuguese, and executed. The rest of the royal family of Andongo was then forced into exile either in Portuguese Brazil or to live in monasteries in Portugal. The Kingdom of Andongo was therefore dissolved and its lands annexed to the Portuguese Crown. A fort was then built on Pungo Andongo. Some of the captives were found to be worth nothing to the Portuguese, as they were nobles protected by prior terms from being taken captive and ransomed.

== See also ==
- List of Ngolas of Ndongo
- Portuguese Angola
