= Mussende =

- Municipality and town
- Location in Angola
- Coordinates: 10°0′S 15°20′E
- Country: Angola
- Province: Cuanza Sul Province

Population (2014 Census)
  - Municipality and town: 82,544
  - Urban: 33,558
- Time zone: UTC+1 (WAT)

Mussende is a town and municipality in Cuanza Sul Province in Angola. The municipality had a population of 82,544 in 2014.
