= Madhusudan Kela =

Indian businessman and investor

Madhusudan Kela is an Indian businessman and investor from Kurud, Chhattisgarh. Madhusudan’s father worked as a bank employee, which influenced his early views on hard work. He was chief investment strategist at Reliance Capital until 2017. He is currently working as the promoter of MK Ventures and a member of the board of various companies.

== Career ==
He graduated in 1991 from K. J. Somaiya Institute of Management Studies and Research (SIMSR) in Mumbai with a Masters in Management Studies. After that, he worked in equity research at CIFCO and Sharekhan. In 1994, he joined Motilal Oswal to start its institutional desk before moving to UBS in 1996. In 2001, he joined Reliance Mutual Fund.

Kela was awarded the Business Standard Equity Fund Manager of the Year (2004) by Manmohan Singh, the then Prime Minister of India. He steadily advanced at Reliance Capital Asset Management Company, eventually being promoted to chief investment officer (CIO) in 2008. He was given more responsibilities and was promoted to the position of the chief investment officer (CIO) in 2008. As the CIO, Kela was responsible for managing the company’s investment portfolio and providing investment advice to the company’s clients.

In 2018, Kela was promoted to the position of the chief investment strategist (CIS). As CIS, he developed investment strategies for the company and guided the team of analysts and fund managers.
