= P. K. Kelkar =

Indian scientist (1909-1990)

Purushottam Kashinath Kelkar
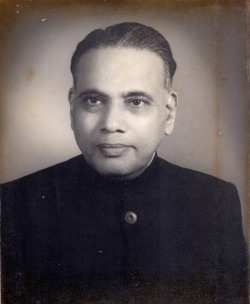
- Born: 1 June 1909; Dharwar, British India
- Died: 23 October 1990 (aged 81); Mumbai, Maharashtra, Republic of India
- Education: Royal Institute of Science Mumbai; Indian Institute of Science; University of Liverpool
- Awards: Padma Bhushan (1970)
- Scientific career
- Workplaces: Veermata Jijabai Technological Institute; Indian Institute of Technology Kanpur; Indian Institute of Technology Mumbai
- Website: pkkelkar.info

Purushottam Kashinath Kelkar (1909-1990) was an Indian scientist who is best remembered for being the founding director of the Indian Institute of Technology Kanpur, which was established in 1959. He was also involved in the planning process for the establishment of the Indian Institute of Technology Mumbai and served as its third director, for a period of 4 years. Kelkar was instrumental in securing USA's technical collaboration in the establishment of IIT Kanpur, by persuading the then USA ambassador, John Kenneth Galbraith to locate the fledgeling institution on the outskirts of Kanpur, in North India. The Government of India awarded him the civilian honour of Padma Bhushan in 1970.

== Education ==
PK Kelkar (PKK) was born on 1 June 1909, in Dharwar, Karnataka, India. His father, Kashinath Hari Kelkar, was a professor of philosophy. He was, therefore, subject to transfers within the area. As a result, PKK received his elementary and secondary education in both Mumbai and Pune.

He graduated with honours in Physics in 1931 from the then Royal Institute of Science, Mumbai. The next year he joined the Indian Institute of Science in Bangalore. He obtained the Diploma in Electrical Engineering in 1934. After that, instead of taking a job in industry, he decided to further his education.

He joined the University of Liverpool as a PhD student. This was possible because of a scholarship from the Ichalkaranji Trust, which was established for financing deserving students. His subject for PhD involved acoustical measurement and the performance of synchronous machinery on load. He completed his Doctorate in Electrical Engineering in 1937, under the guidance of Dr. J.C. Prescott. Just before finishing his doctoral work there was a fire in the laboratory. He lost a lot of his data and had to do the work all over again. After getting his PhD, he worked at Metropolitan-Vickers as an intern in power systems.

== Career ==
PKK returned to India soon afterwards and joined his alma mater, IISc., as lecturer in Electrical Engineering from 1937 to 1943. While he was there, he edited a newsletter for the electrical engineering department. Among his colleagues were well known physicists like Nobel Laureate C.V. Raman, Homi Bhabha, and Vikram Sarabhai. However, it seems that the politics of the institute was not favourable to his growth and success.

In 1943, he accepted the post of Professor and Head of the Department of Electrical Engineering at the Victoria Jubilee Technical Institute in Mumbai (VJTI), where he continued until 1956. Some of his colleagues, who knew PKK from Bangalore, thought it was a step down in going from a research institution like Indian Institute of Science to VJTI, which is an engineering institute.

His involvement with the planning of the Indian Institutes of Technology(IIT) began in mid-1955 shortly after it had been decided to be set up in Mumbai as the second such institute. IIT Bombay was to be set up with financial and academic assistance from the USSR, mediated by the UNESCO.

According to Prof. M.V. Hariharan of IIT Bombay,

Kelkar was a teacher–philosopher, able to see years ahead. He said that if engineering were the muscle for development, science was the brain. And that only with humanities could engineering education have a heart. Because then the instruction imparted to students became, in some sense, relevant to social needs.

When Kelkar moved to IIT Kanpur in 1959 as its first director, he set about infusing that institute with the same characteristics: accomplished faculty from diverse schools of thought, and a healthy curricular presence for the sciences and the humanities. By the mid-1960s, just a few years into its operations, as much as 40% of the B Tech curriculum at IIT Kanpur was given over to these foundations. According to a book on IIT Kanpur's history, Prof. Kelkar's influence helped IITK in ‘breaking out from the dark clouds of traditional systems in technical education’.

After a completing his tenure at Kanpur, Dr. Kelkar returned to Mumbai as the 2nd director of IIT Bombay from 1970 to 1974.

== Death ==
Dr. Kelkar died in October 1990. IIT Kanpur, in 2002 renamed its central library as the P. K. Kelkar Library. The Kelkar Alumni Lecture was also instituted in recognition to a person who had made distinct contribution to the technical education in India through building and developing IIT Kanpur. Kelkar was a distant cousin of, Dinkar G. Kelkar who belonged to the same gharana, and was also a distant relative of Panditrao and Dnyaneshwar Agashe through their mother.
