= Kela-2 gas field =

Natural gas field in Xinjiang, China

Kela-2
- Country: China
- Region: Xinjiang
- Offshore/onshore: onshore
- Operator: China National Petroleum Corporation

Field history
- Discovery: 1998
- Start of production: 2004

Production
- Current production of gas: 7×10^{6} m^{3}/d 248×10^{6} cu ft/d 2.55×10^{9} m^{3}/a (90×10^{9} cu ft/a)
- Estimated gas in place: 284×10^{9} m^{3} 10.082×10^{12} cu ft

The Kela-2 gas field is a natural gas field located in Xinjiang, China. Discovered in 1998, it was developed by the China National Petroleum Corporation, determining it to have initial total proven reserves of the Kela-2 gas field are around 10 trillion ft^{3} (284 km^{3}). It began production of natural gas and condensates in 2004, with a production rate of around 248 million ft^{3}/day (7×10^{5} m^{3}).
