= Karibo =

- commune
- Country: Angola
- Province: Malanje

Area
  - Total: 183 sq mi (473 km^{2})

Population (2014)
  - Total: 2,950
  - Density: 16.2/sq mi (6.24/km^{2})
- Time zone: UTC+1 (WAT)

Karibo (or Caribo) is a commune of Angola, located in the province of Malanje.

== See also ==
- Communes of Angola
