= List of municipalities of Angola =

Municipalities of Angola

The following is a list of municipalities of Angola, grouped by province.

Angola contains 21 províncias (provinces) which are divided into 326 municípios (translated as either municipality or city council), and these are further sub-divided into 378 comunas (communes). Previously, it had 18 provinces, 164 municipalities and 559 communes. Icolo e Bengo (which emerged from the division of the province of Luanda), Cuando (which emerged from the division of Cuando Cubango), and Moxico Leste (which emerged from the division of the province of Moxico) are the three new provinces that resulted from this new political and administrative division.

Angolan Municipalities
Province	Capital	Municipalities
Bengo	Caxito	6: Ambriz, Bula Atumba, Dande, Dembos-Quibaxe, Nambuangongo, Pango Aluquém
Benguela	Benguela	10: Balombo, Baía Farta, Benguela, Bocoio, Caimbambo, Catumbela, Chongorói, Cubal, Ganda, Lobito
Bié	Kuito	9: Andulo, Camacupa, Catabola, Chinguar, Chitembo, Cuemba, Cunhinga, Cuíto, N'harea
Cabinda	Cabinda	4: Belize, Buco-Zau, Cabinda, Cacongo
Cuando Cubango (Kuando-Kubango)	Menongue	9: Calai, Cuangar, Cuchi, Cuito Cuanavale, Dirico, Mavinga, Menongue, Nancova, Rivungo
Cuanza Norte (Kwanza-Norte)	N'dalatando	10: Ambaca, Banga, Bolongongo, Cambambe, Cazengo, Golungo Alto, Gonguembo, Lucala, Quiculungo, Samba Cajú
Cuanza Sul (Kwanza-Sul)	Sumbe	12: Amboim, Cassongue, Cela, Waku Kungo, Conda, Ebo, Libolo, Mussende, Quibala, Quilenda, Seles, Sumbe
Cunene	Ondjiva	6: Cahama, Cuanhama, Curoca, Cuvelai, Namacunde, Ombadja
Huambo	Huambo	11: Bailundo, Caála, Katchiungo, Ekunha, Huambo, Londuimbale, Longonjo, Mungo, Tchicala-Tcholoanga, Tchindjenje, Ucuma
Huíla	Lubango	14: Caconda, Caluquembe, Chiange, Chibia, Chicomba, Chipindo, Gambos, Humpata, Jamba, Kuvango, Lubango, Matala, Quilengues, Quipungo
Luanda	Luanda	9: Belas, Cacuaco, Cazenga, Icolo e Bengo, Luanda, Quilamba Quiaxi, Quissama, Talatona, Viana
Lunda Norte (Lunda-Norte)	Dundo	10: Cambulo, Capenda-Camulemba, Caungula, Chitato, Cuango, Cuilo, Lóvua, Lubalo, Lucapa, Xá-Muteba
Lunda Sul (Lunda-Sul)	Saurimo	4: Cacolo, Dala, Muconda, Saurimo
Malanje (Malange)	Malanje	14: Cacuso, Calandula, Cambundi-Catembo, Cangandala, Caombo, Cunda-dia-baze, Kivaba Nzogi, Luquembo, Malanje, Marimba, Massango, Mucari, Quela, Quirima
Moxico	Luena	9: Alto Zambeze, Camanongue, Cameia, Leua, Luau, Luena, Luacano, Lumbala Nguimbo (Bundas), Luchazes
Namibe	Moçâmedes	5: Bibala, Camacuio, Moçâmedes, Tômbua, Virei
Uíge	Uíge	16: Ambuila, Bembe, Buengas, Bungo, Cangola, Damba, Mucaba, Negage, Puri, Quimbele, Quitexe, Santa Cruz, Sanza Pombo, Songo, Uíge, Maquela do Zombo
Zaire	M'Banza Kongo	6: Cuimba, M'Banza Kongo, Noqui, N'Zeto, Soyo, Tomboco

== See also ==
- Provinces of Angola
