= Kalandula Falls =

- Calandula Falls; Quedas de Kalandula
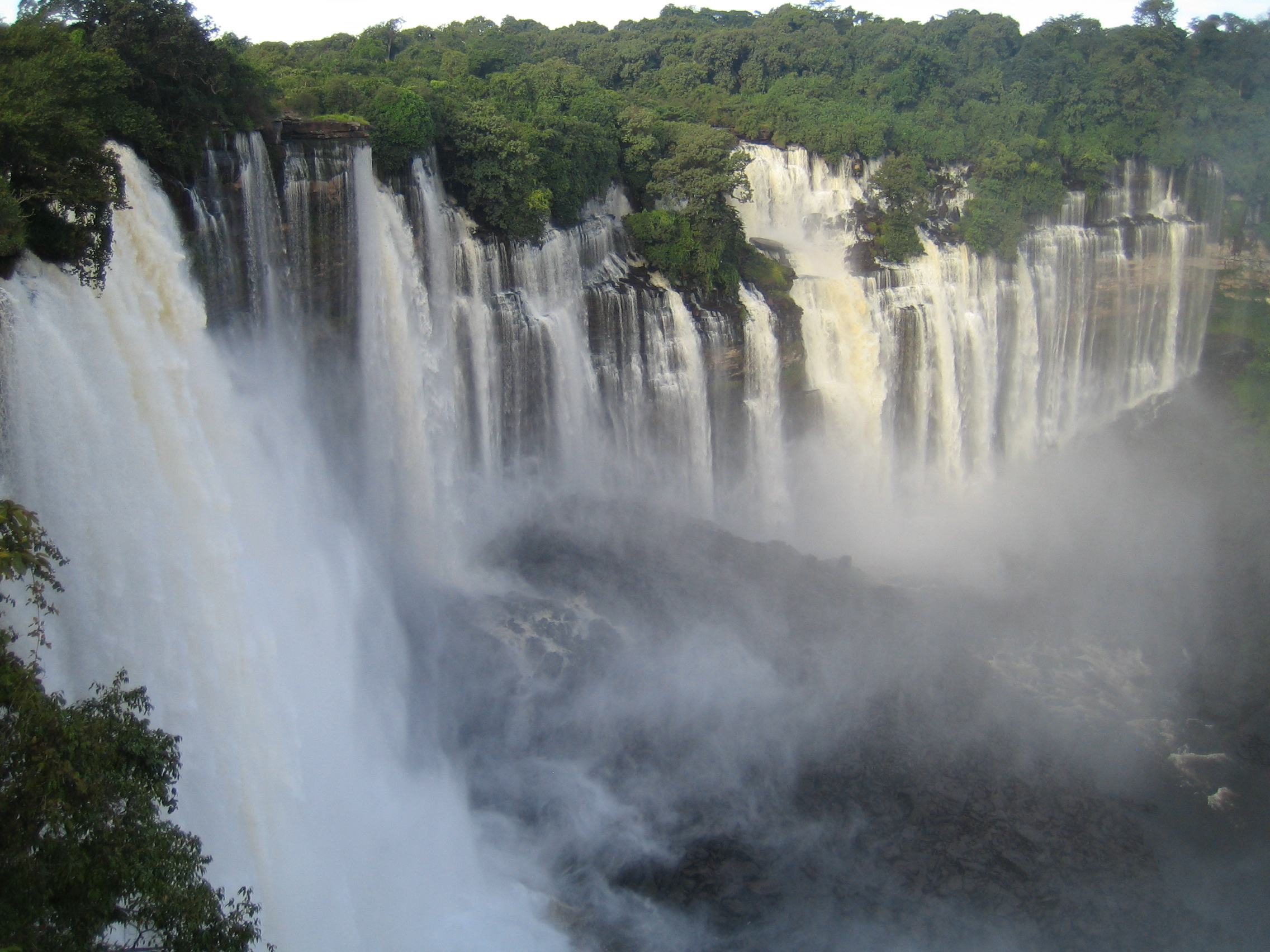
- Kalandula Falls

- Location within Angola
- Location: Calandula, Malanje Province, Angola
- Coordinates: 9°4′33″S 16°0′12″E
- Total height: 105 m (344 ft)
- Total width: 400 m (1,300 ft)
- Watercourse: Lucala

Kalandula Falls or Calandula Falls (Portuguese: Quedas de Kalandula; formerly known as Duque de Bragança Falls) are waterfalls in the municipality of Calandula, Malanje Province, Angola. On the Lucala River, the falls are 105 meters (344 feet) high and 400 meters (1,300 feet) wide. They are one of the largest waterfalls by volume in Africa. The distance from Luanda is 360 km (220 mi).

== See also ==
- List of waterfalls
- List of waterfalls by flow rate
