= Diwakar Krushna Kelkar =

Marathi writer

- Born: October 19, 1902; Bombay Presidency, British India
- Died: May 31, 1973 (aged 70)
- Occupations: Writer; lawyer
- Writing career
- Pen name: Diwakar Krushna
- Notable works: Samadhiwarali Phule, Rupagarvita Ani Itar Goshti

Diwakar Krushna Kelkar ( (1902 – 1973) was a Marathi writer from Maharashtra, India. He wrote short stories, plays, and novels under the name Diwakar Krushna.

He worked as a lawyer in the city of Hyderabad, which is now in Andhra Pradesh.

Kelkar was a pioneer in composing Marathi short stories which brought out the inner workings of the human mind.

Samadhiwarali Phule (समाधीवरली फुले) and Rupagarvita Ani Itar Goshti (रूपगर्विता आणि इतर गोष्टी) are two compilations of his short stories.
