= Lombe =

Town in the Malanje Province of Angola

- Town
- Location within Angola
- Coordinates: 09°29′00″S 16°09′00″E
- Country: Angola
- Province: Malanje
- Time zone: UTC+1:00 (WAT)

Lombe is a town in Angola in Malanje Province.

== Namesakes ==
There are other towns with this name in Cuanza Sul Province and Zaire Province.

== Transport ==
Lombe is served by a station on the Luanda Railways.

== See also ==
- Railway stations in Angola
