= Cuaba Nzoji =

Town in Malanje province, Angola

Cuaba Nzoji Kiwaba Nzoji
- Municipality and town
- Location in Angola
- Coordinates: 9°02′38″S 16°34′26″E
- Country: Angola
- Province: Malanje Province

Population (2014 Census)
  - Total: 15,880
- Time zone: UTC+1 (WAT)

Kiwaba Nzoji is a town and municipality in Malanje Province in Angola.

The municipality had a population of 21,139 in 2024. 10,629 are male and 10,510 are female.
