= Cacuzo =

- Municipality and town
- Location in Angola
- Coordinates: 9°25′S 15°44′E
- Country: Angola
- Province: Malanje Province

Population (2014)
  - Total: 39,302
- Time zone: UTC+1 (WAT)

Cacuso is a town and municipality in Malanje Province in Angola.

== Transport ==
It is served by a station on the Luanda Railways.

== Economy ==
Since 2014, the city has had an alcohol and electricity sugar plant, the first being installed in Angola. Owned by the company Biocom the technology used in the plant was all Brazilian. Cacuso also has two hotels located on the sides of the highway that cuts it in half, as well as bank.
