= Bhaskar Ramchandra Tambe =

Indian poet

- Born: October 27, 1873; Mugawali
- Died: December 7, 1941
- Citizenship: Indian
- Education: Allahabad University
- Occupation: Poet
- Writing career
- Language: Marathi
- Subjects: Love, empathy toward women, especially toward child widows
- Notable awards: Princely Poet

Bhaskar Ramchandra Tambe (1873–1941) was a Marathi poet from Bombay Presidency, British India.

Tambe was born on October 27, 1873, in the town of Mugawali near Gwalior.

In 1893, he passed his high school matriculation examination conducted by Allahabad University. He then started his college education in Agra; however, he terminated it without graduating in order to support his brother's education by accepting a position as a teacher in the princely state of Dewas. Subsequently, he acquired the position of the tutor for the young prince of Dewas. This appointment fortuitously provided him easy access to the ruler's personal library.

A few years later, he became the personal secretary for the Dewas ruler. Still later, he served for some years as a judge in a small town. In 1926, he settled in the princely state of Gwalior until his death on December 7, 1941.

In 1932, Tambe presided over the "poetry" section of Marathi Sahitya Sammelan which was held that year in Kolhapur. Tambe retired from active duty in 1937. The same year the rule of Gwalior honored him by naming him as the state's Princely Poet (राजकवि).

During 1890-1941, Tambe wrote about 225 poems. Poet Vasudeo Govind Maydeo (वासुदेव गोविंद मायदेव) compiled in 1920 a collection of Tambe's 75 poems under the title "भास्कर रामचंद्र तांबे यांची कविता". In 1935, Dr. Madhavrao Patwardhan published a more complete anthology, "तांबे यांची समग्र कविता". This has undergone several important revisions and remains in print, a tribute to the continued popularity of his poetry, many of whose poems have been made into still-popular songs sung by Bollywood playback singers Lata Mangeshkar and Asha Bhosle.

A majority of Tambe's poetry is about love, including conjugal love, though love of Nature is a close second. But among all Marathi poets of his generation, Tambe stands alone in displaying through his poetry enormous empathy toward women, especially toward child widows. These poems implicitly disparaged the social mores of his time whereby old men married teenaged girls who were sometimes left widowed and were essentially left to spend their entire adult lives without a partner.
