= Malanje Province =

Province of Angola

Coordinates: 9°32′00″S 16°21′00″E

Malanje
- Province
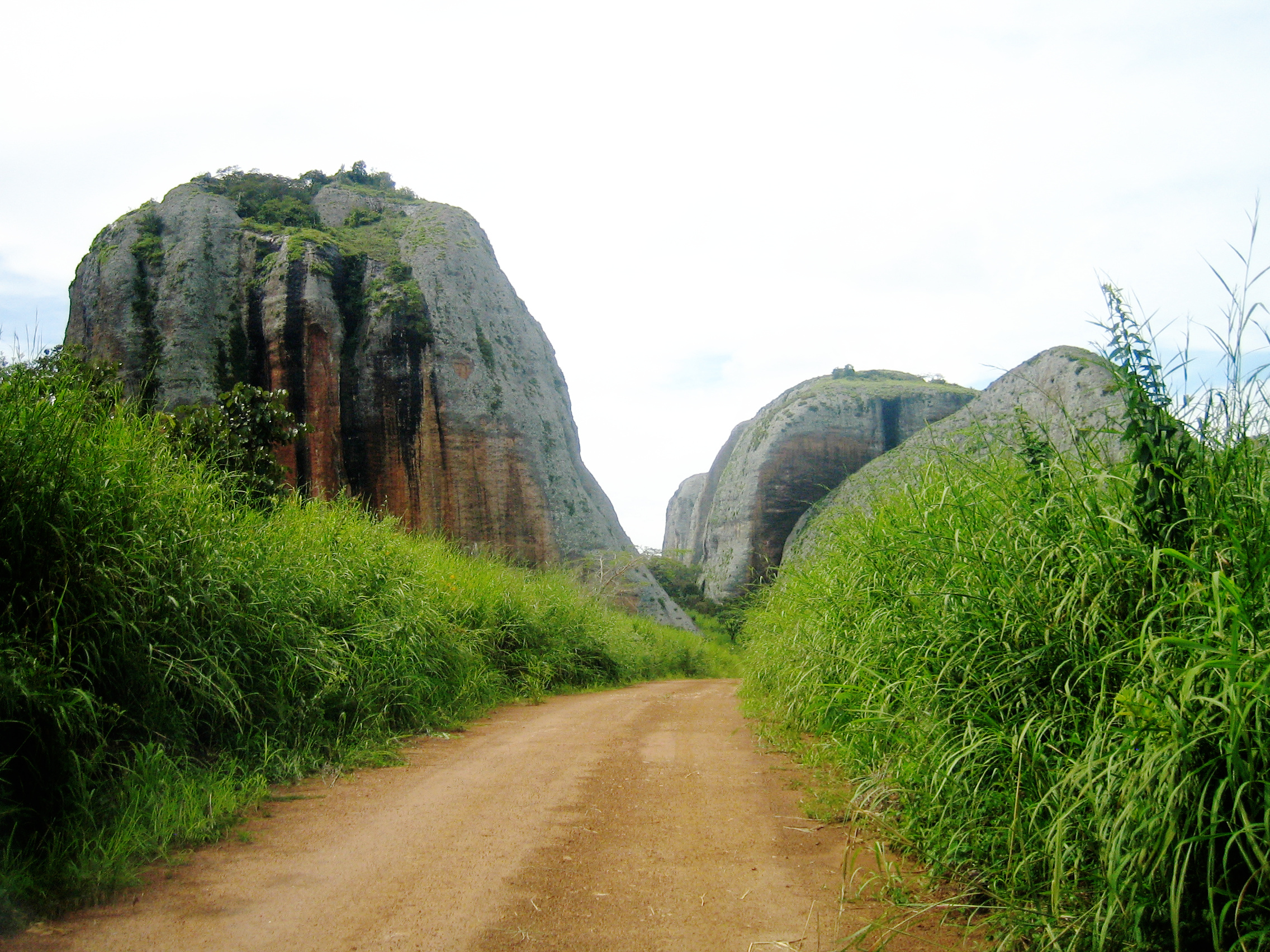
- The Black Rocks of Pungo Andongo

- Malanje, province of Angola
- Country: Angola
- Capital: Malanje

Government
  - Governor: Marcos Alexandre Nhunga
  - Vice-Governor for the Political, Economic and Social Sector: Franco Cazembe Mufinda
  - Vice-Governor for Technical Services and Infrastructures: Duarte Andre Ginga

Area
  - Total: 87,136 km^{2} (33,643 sq mi)

Population (2024 census)
  - Total: 1,298,250
  - Density: 14.899/km^{2} (38.589/sq mi)
- Time zone: UTC+01:00 (WAT)
- ISO 3166 code: AO-MAL
- HDI (2018): 0.555 medium · 7th
- Website: www.malanje.gov.ao

Malanje is a province of Angola. It has an area of 87,136 km^{2} and a 2024 census population of 1,298,250. Malanje is the provincial capital.

== Geography ==
The Malanje Province is located in the north of Angola, the provincial capital and largest town of Malanje located 383 kilometres (238 mi) by road east of the national capital of Luanda. It is bordered to the northwest by Uige Province, to the northeast by the Democratic Republic of the Congo, to the east by Lunda Norte Province and Lunda Sul Province, to the south by Bié Province and Cuanza Sul Province, and in the west by Cuanza Norte Province. The extreme north of the province is covered with savannah, while the southern part is largely dry savannah. The main rivers are the Cuanza River in the southwest and Kwango River in the northeast, and there is a mountainous area known as the Malanje Plateau. The Cuije River and Cuanza flow in the vicinity of Cangandala National Park. Large areas north and southeast of the city of Malanje have been declared protected areas. Of note is the Milando Reserve Park (Reserva Especial do Milando) in the north and the Reserva Natural Integral do Luando at the headwaters of Cuanza.

== Municipalities ==
The province of Malanje consists of fourteen municipalities (Portuguese: municípios):

- Cacuso
- Calandula
- Cambundi-Catembo
- Cangandala
- Caombo
- Cuaba Nzoji
- Kunda-dia-Base
- Luquembo
- Malanje
- Marimba
- Massango
- Mucari
- Quela
- Quirima

== Communes ==
The province of Malanje contains the following 66 communes (Portuguese: comunas), sorted by their respective municipalities:

- Cacuso Municipality: – Cacuso, Lombe, Pungo-Andongo, Quizenga (Kizenga), Soqueco (Sokeko)
- Calandula Municipality: – Calandula, Cateco-Cangola (Kateco-Kangola), Cota (Kota), Cuale, Quinje
- Cambundi-Catembo Municipality: – Cambundi-Catembo, Dumba Cambango, Quitapa, Tala Mungongo
- Cangandala Municipality: – Bembo, Cangandala, Caribo (Karibo), Culamagia
- Caombo Municipality: – Bange-Angola, Cambo Suinginge, Caombo, Micanda
- Cuaba Nzoji Municipality: – Cuaba Nzoji, Mufuma
- Kunda-dia-Base Municipality: – Kunda-dia-Base (Cunda-dia-Baze), Lemba, Milando
- Luquembo Municipality: – Capunda, Cunga Palanga, Dombo, Luquembo, Quimbango, Rimba
- Malanje Municipality: – Cambaxe (Kambaxe), Malanje, Ngola-Luije (Nugola-Luije)
- Marimba Municipality: – Cabombo-Lumai, Marimba, Tembo-Aluma
- Massango Municipality: – Massango, Quihuhu, Quinguengue
- Mucari Municipality: – Catala, Caxinga, Mucari-Caculama, Muquixe (Mikixi)
- Quela Municipality: – Bângalas (Missão dos Bangalas), Moma, Quela, Xandele
- Quirima Municipality: – Quirima, Sautar

== Economy ==
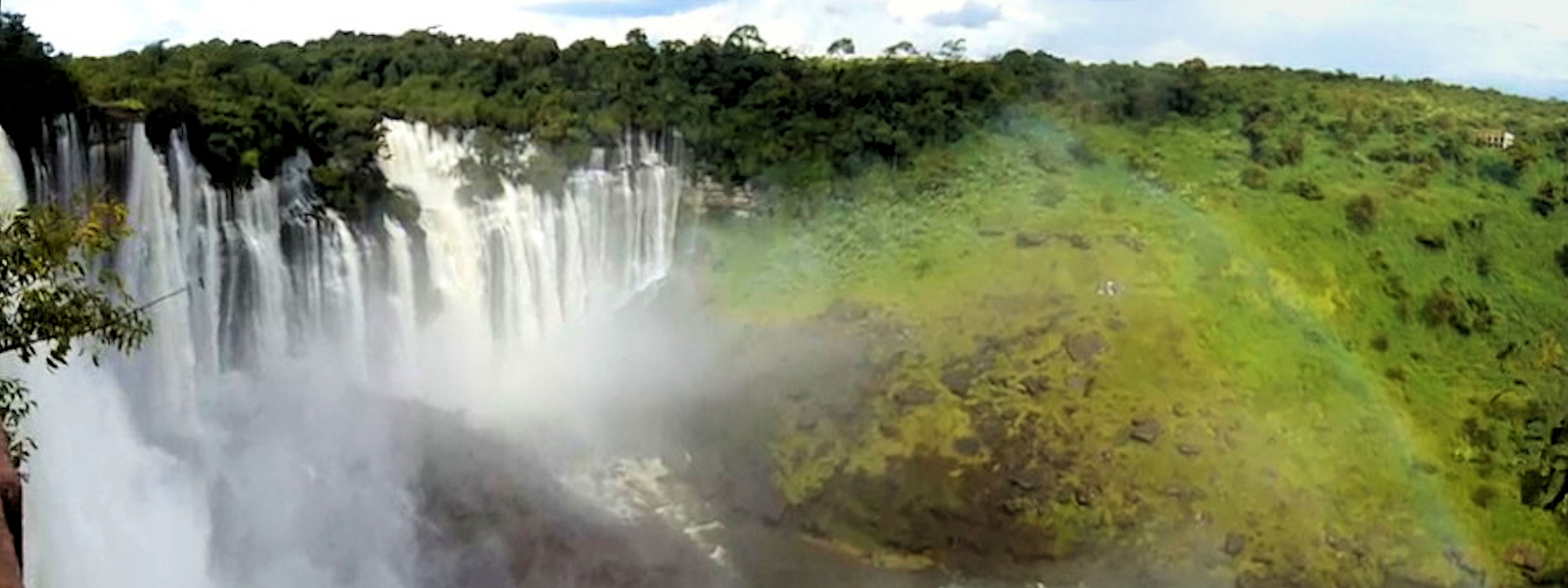
Kalandula Falls

The province is predominantly agricultural. The most intensively used area in the province of Malanje is the area around the provincial capital, where cotton and sugarcane are the most important industries. The cotton industry was once of vital importance to the national economy, but the years of the Angola Civil War have badly stagnated it. Agriculture in Malanje Province is gradually taking off again, and numerous international investors have been involved, including US$30 million from Brazil to develop the maize and sugarcane industry in the Pungo Andongo area. Malanje Province is also a producer of cassava, sweet potatoes, peanuts, rice, soybeans, sunflowers and various vegetables. The province also has significant reserves of diamonds, limestone, manganese (with 4,682 metric tons exported in 1973), uranium and phosphate.

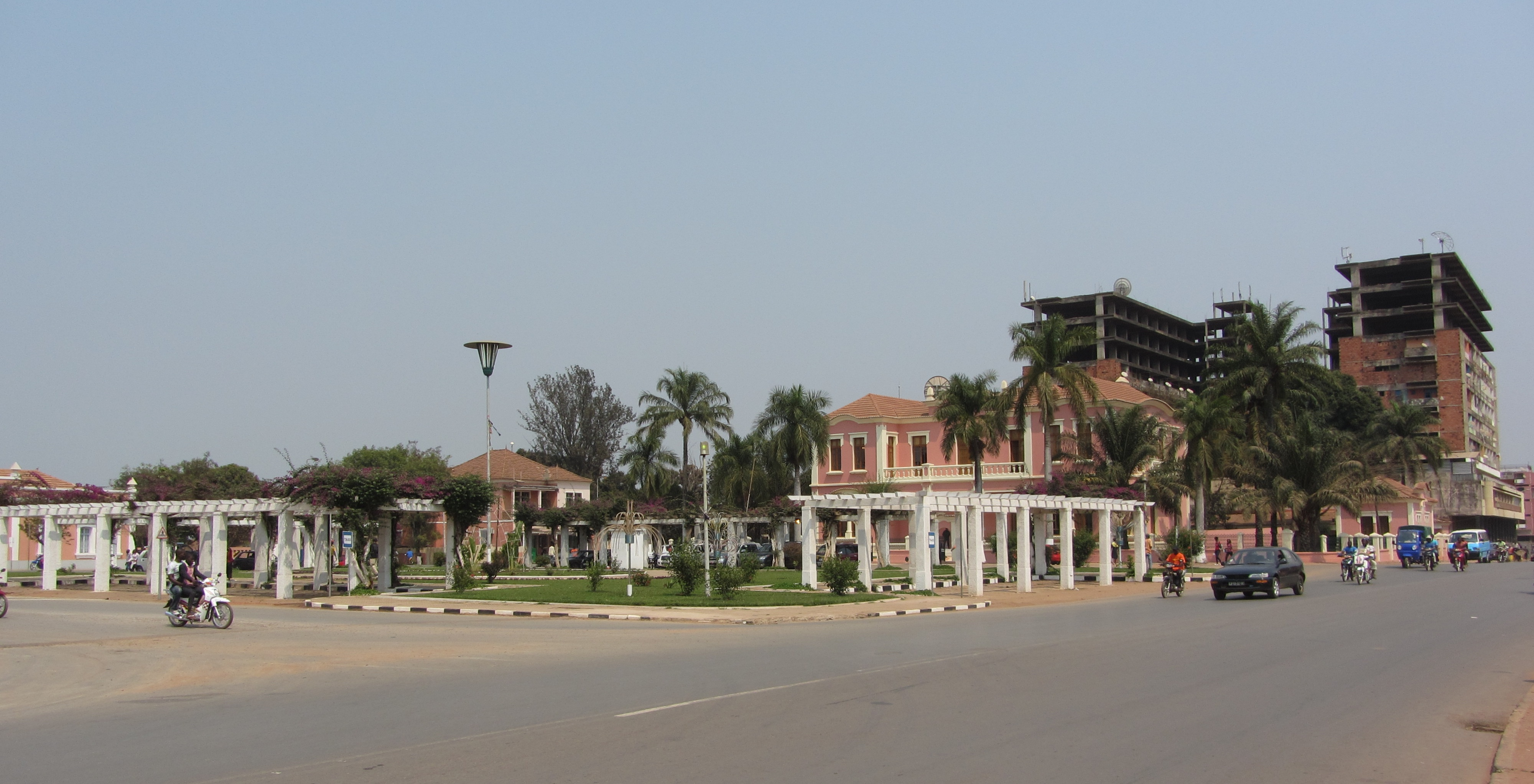
City centre of Malanje

Tourism has become more important, largely due to its diverse natural attractions, including the Kalandula Falls, the black rock formation of Pungo Andongo, two nature reserves and the Cangandala National Park. Cangandala National Park, the smallest national park in the country, was originally established under Portuguese rule in 1963 to protect the Giant Sable Antelope, before being declared a national park on 25 June 1970.

== List of governors of Malanje ==
Name	Years in office
Eusébio Sebastião	1977–1978
Domingos Afonso Neto	1978–1980
Col. Ludy Kissassunda	1980–1986
Lt.Col. João Ernesto dos Santos Liberdade	1986–1992
João Filipe Martins	1992
João Manuel Bernardo	1992–1993
Flávio João Fernandes	1993–2002
Cristóvão Domingos Francisco da Cunha	2002–2008
Norberto Fernandes dos Santos Kwata Kwanawa	2012–

Up to 1991, the official name was Provincial Commissioner
