= Mucari =

- Municipality and town
- Location in Angola
- Coordinates: 9°28′S 16°55′E
- Country: Angola
- Province: Malanje Province

Population (2014 Census)
  - Total: 30,112
- Time zone: UTC+1 (WAT)

Mucari is a town and municipality in Malanje Province in Angola. The municipality had a population of 30,112 in 2014.
