= Luquembo =

- Municipality and town
- Location in Angola
- Coordinates: 10°44′S 17°53′E
- Country: Angola
- Province: Malanje Province

Population (2014 Census)
  - Total: 54,880
- Time zone: UTC+1 (WAT)
- Climate: Aw

Luquembo is a town and municipality in Malanje Province in Angola. The municipality had a population of 54,880 in 2014.
