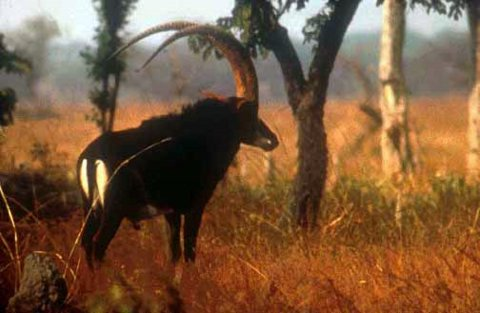
- Giant sable bull (Richard Estes, 1972)

Conservation status
- Critically Endangered (IUCN 3.1)
- CITES Appendix I

Scientific classification
- Kingdom: Animalia
- Phylum: Chordata
- Class: Mammalia
- Order: Artiodactyla
- Family: Bovidae
- Subfamily: Hippotraginae
- Genus: Hippotragus
- Species: H. niger
- Subspecies: H. n. variani

Trinomial name
- Hippotragus niger variani Thomas, 1916
- Geographic range

= Giant sable antelope =

Rare subspecies of the sable antelope

The giant sable antelope (Hippotragus niger variani) is a critically endangered subspecies of the common sable antelope native and endemic to the central highlands of Angola, occurring specifically in two areas: Cangandala National Park (south of the city of Malanje) and Luando Natural Strict Reserve (between the Kwanza and Luando Rivers, south of Cangandala).

== Taxonomy ==
The giant sable antelope was formally described in 1916 by British zoologist Oldfield Thomas of the Natural History Museum, London, who designated it a new subspecies of the sable antelope, Hippotragus niger, under the trinomial name Hippotragus niger variani. The subspecific epithet honours Frank Varian, the British railway engineer who first brought the animal to scientific attention while working on the construction of Angola's Benguela Railway.

The sable antelope belongs to the subfamily Hippotraginae within the family Bovidae, a grouping that also includes the roan antelope (Hippotragus equinus) and the extinct bluebuck (Hippotragus leucophaeus). Four subspecies of Hippotragus niger are currently recognised: the giant sable (H. n. variani), the common or southern sable (H. n. niger), the Zambian or Kirk's sable (H. n. kirkii), and Roosevelt's sable (H. n. roosevelti). The giant sable is the only subspecies endemic to Angola.

Molecular studies have confirmed the giant sable's status as a genetically distinct lineage. Mitochondrial DNA analysis places its divergence from other sable populations at between 120,000 and 170,000 years ago, a separation attributed to Pleistocene climatic isolation in the Cuanza river basin. Subsequent analysis of nuclear markers has found very low historical gene flow between the giant sable and all other subspecies, supporting its recognition as a separate taxonomic unit.

== Discovery ==
It was first described in 1916 by Frank Varian, a British engineer and naturalist, as a new subspecies of sable antelope distinguished by its size, horn structure and length, and unique facial markings. At the time, Varian worked on the construction of Angola's Benguela Railway, which connected the inland mining areas with the Atlantic coast. His work in the remote highlands brought him into contact with some of the country's unique wildlife, leading to his discovery of the giant sable, which he subsequently documented and brought to scientific attention. The giant sable was the last of the large mammals to be discovered, with its discovery occurring after that of the Okapi.

There was a great degree of uncertainty regarding the number of animals that survived during the Angolan Civil War. In January 2004, a group from the Centro de Estudos e Investigação Científica of the Catholic University of Angola, led by Dr. Pedro Vaz Pinto, obtained photographic evidence of one of the remaining herds from a series of trap cameras installed in Cangandala National Park.

However, the discovery brought as much alarm as relief: every animal photographed was female, and without a male the population faced certain extinction. In 2009, following DNA evidence from dung samples, a mature giant sable bull was located in the Luando Integral Natural Reserve, approximately 100 kilometres away. With the assistance of the Angolan Air Force, the bull was located, sedated and airlifted by helicopter to join the surviving females in a newly fenced enclosure in Cangandala. The Cangandala herd is today continuously monitored through regular ground patrols and drone surveys, and has grown to approximately 60 individuals comprising a healthy mix of bulls, cows, and calves.

The giant sable antelope is currently defined as critically endangered on the IUCN Red List of Threatened Species. As of 2026 the total population is estimated to around 310 individuals in 8 herds (one in Cangandala and the other seven in the Luando Reserve).

== Description ==
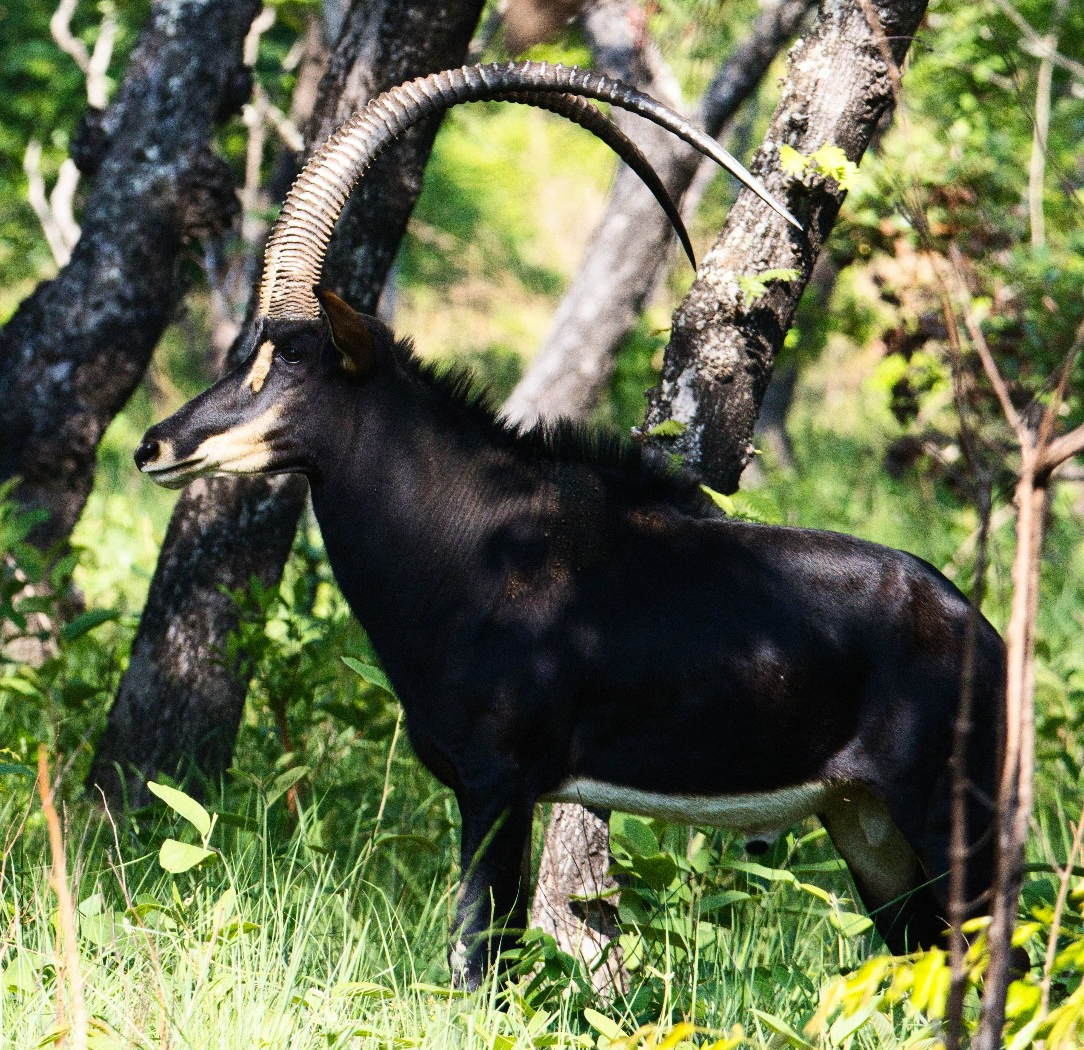
Juvenile giant sable bull in Cangandala (Marcus Frazão, 2024)

The name giant refers to the exceptional length and sweep of the bull's horns, which are the largest of any sable subspecies. Mature bulls weigh an average of 240 kg (530 lb) with a shoulder height of 142 cm (56 in); cows may weigh around 220 kg (490 lb) and stand slightly shorter. The body is powerfully built with a deep chest, a powerful neck, and an upright stance that gives the animal a distinctly horse-like silhouette.

Both sexes carry horns. In males these rise steeply from the skull before sweeping backward and slightly outward in a dramatic arc, heavily ridged with annular rings. The length will often be upward of 129 cm (51 in). The largest giant sable horns on record measured 165 cm (65 in), taken by the Count of Yebes in Angola in 1949, which remains the world record for the subspecies. Female horns range 61–102 cm (24–40 in) in length and are considerably straighter than in males.

Sexual dimorphism is pronounced beyond horns morphology. Males and females are similar in appearance until around three years of age, after which the sexes diverge markedly. Adult bulls develop a jet black coat, sweeping horns, and erect neck mane that make the subspecies so distinctive. Cows retain the rich chestnut coloring of juveniles throughout their lives, carry shorter and straighter horns, and are slightly smaller in body size. The contrast between a glossy black bull and the chestnut cows of his herd is one of the most striking visual features of the subspecies.

The facial markings are distinctive and unique among the sable subspecies. Most sable antelopes have white "eyebrows"; in the giant sable the rostrum is additionally divided by a broad white cheek stripe running from eye to muzzle, set against the jet black coat of adult bulls. The belly and rump patches are also white.

== Behavior ==
Giant sable antelopes are gregarious, living in mixed herds typically comprising adult females, juveniles, and calves, led by a single dominant bull. Bachelor groups of younger males occupy separate ranges, with maturing bulls gradually challenging older dominants as they come into their prime. Herd size in both protected areas varies seasonally, with animals concentrating around water sources and areas of fresh grazing during the dry season.

The dominant bull is highly protective of his herd and will confront intruders directly, including predators and rival males. This behavior makes the dominant male quite vulnerable when a hunting group approaches the herd. Bulls can be especially dangerous when approached at close range or wounded. When competing for dominance, males adopt a distinctive fighting posture: dropping to their front knees and engaging in horn-wrestling bouts, using their swept-back horns to push and parry. Despite the intensity of these contests, serious injuries or fatalities are rare.

Like all antelopes, giant sables are otherwise shy and alert by nature. When startled, they will typically run for only a short distance before stopping to look back at the source of the disturbance. When actively pursued, however, they can sustain a fast gallop for several minutes, covering considerable distances while seeking cover in woodland. Juveniles are vulnerable to smaller predators like leopards, while adults face threats from lions and rarely crocodiles.

Giant sable are diurnal, with peak activity in the early morning and late afternoon. During the heat of the day herds typically rest in shade at the woodland edge.

== Evolution ==
The genetic distinctiveness of the giant sable has been established through evidence drawn from living animals, museum smaples, and hunting collections. DNA extracted from sedated animals in the field was found to be fully consistent with sequences from museum specimens and hunting trophies of known provenance — confirming both the animal's survival and its status as a genetically separate lineage from all other sable populations. Mitochondrial DNA studies show the time at which the giant sable diverged from other sable lineages at somewhere between 120,000 and 170,000 years ago, a separation possibly linked to Pleistocene climate shifts that isolated an ancestral population in the Cuanza river basin of central Angola. Analysis of nuclear markers has since confirmed that the giant sable has experienced very low gene flow with other populations over this entire period, making it one of the most genetically distinctive large antelope in Africa.

== Habitat ==
The giant sable antelope is endemic to the Angolan wet miombo woodland ecoregion of the central Angolan plateau, at elevations between approximately 1,000 and 1,500 metres (3,280–4,920 ft) above sea level. Its present range is confined entirely to Malanje Province and comprises two protected areas: Cangandala National Park (approximately 600 km²), situated between the Cuije and Cuque rivers south of Malanje city, and Luando Integral Natural Reserve (approximately 8,800 km²), lying between the Kwanza and Luando rivers to the south. No confirmed populations are known to exist outside these two reserves.

A mosaic of miombo woodland and seasonally flooded grassland clearings known as anharas constitutes the prime habitat for giant sable herds in both protected areas. The miombo canopy is semi-open and dominated by broad-leaved deciduous trees including Brachystegia boehmii, Julbernardia paniculata, and Isoberlinia species, which shed their leaves during the dry season, allowing ground-level grasses to flourish. As an edge species, the giant sable favors the ecotone between wooded savanna and open grassland, and generally avoids expanses of unbroken open plain.

The distinctive distribution pattern of the subspecies has been linked to the presence of anharas, whose unique vegetation is influenced by nutrient-poor soils and localized climatic conditions. It has been hypothesized that the giant sable lineage evolved confined to the Cuanza river basin and isolated over an extended timescale, and thus became progressively adapted to these particular habitat conditions.

Seasonal fires are a regular feature of the miombo landscape and play an important role in shaping the giant sable's grazing behaviour. Fires typically sweep through the drier grassland areas in the late dry season, and giant sable antelope consistently concentrate their foraging on recently burned ground once sufficient green regrowth has emerged. The flush of new shoots that follows a burn is substantially more nutritious than the mature standing grass available elsewhere — a critical benefit at the time of year when forage quality across the miombo is generally at its lowest.

== In popular culture ==
=== National symbol of Angola ===
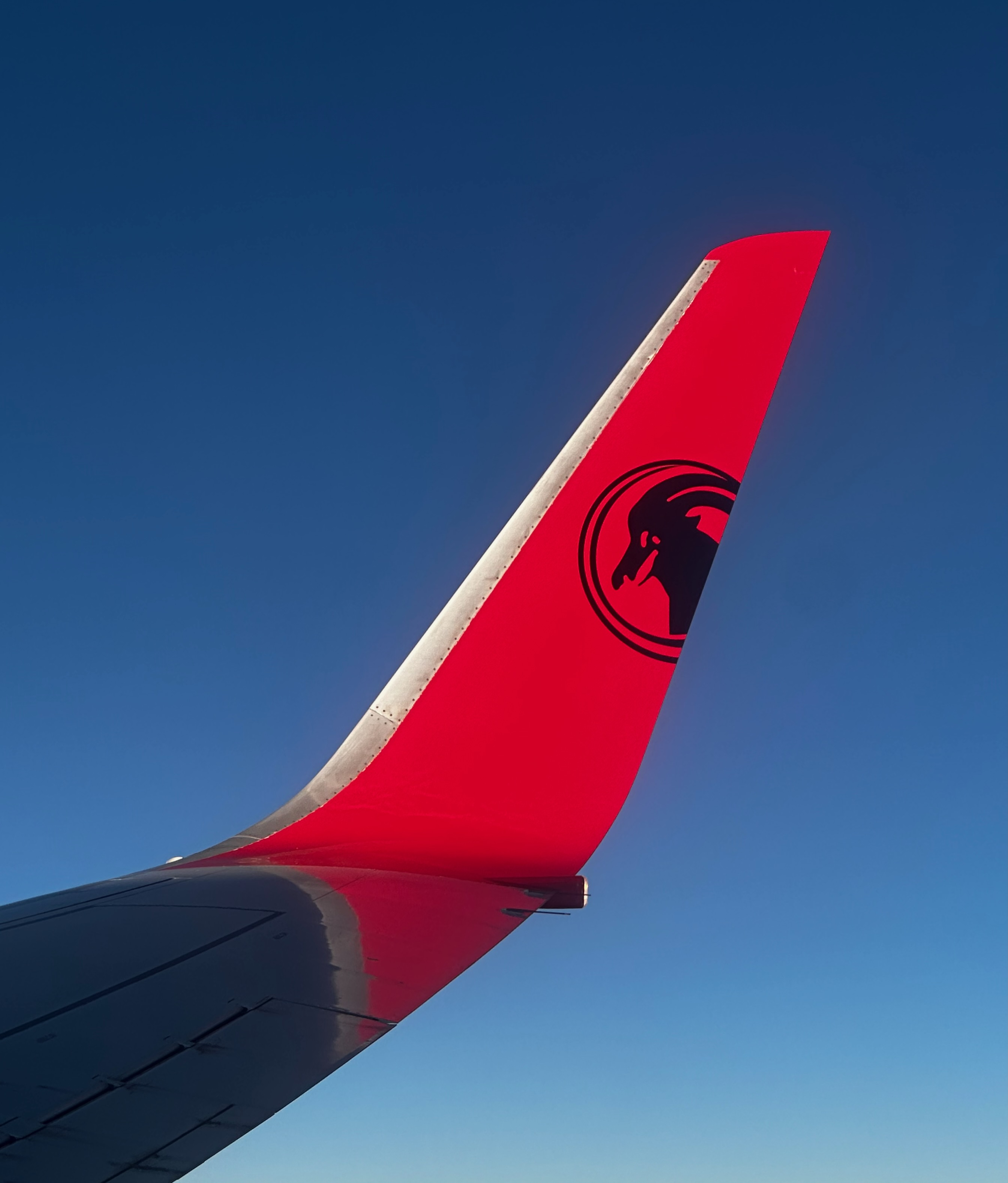
Giant sable symbol on a TAAG aircraft

The giant sable holds a totemic status among the communities resident in and around its range, where it is known by the local names kolo and sumbakaloko. Its cultural significance long predates its scientific description: the animal had been protected and revered by local tribes for centuries before Frank Varian brought it to the attention of the outside world in 1916. It was the first animal in Angola to receive full legal protection under colonial administration, and was quickly embraced as an icon during that period. Since Angola's independence in 1975, its status as a national emblem has been further reinforced, and its image appears on the country's postage stamps, banknotes, passports. It is the official symbol of TAAG, the national airline.

Beyond its presence on official state materials, the giant sable's Portuguese name — palanca-negra-gigante — has passed into everyday Angolan cultural life. The Angola national football team is known as the Palancas Negras in the animal's honour. The unanimous recognition of the giant sable as a national symbol constitutes a rare unifying force across Angola's diverse ethnic groups, religious communities and political traditions, and as such contributes to social cohesion and national pride. This deep symbolic resonance is widely credited as one of the reasons the animal survived the civil war years with any population intact at all, as many Angolans regarded hunting it as close to sacrilege.

=== Literature ===
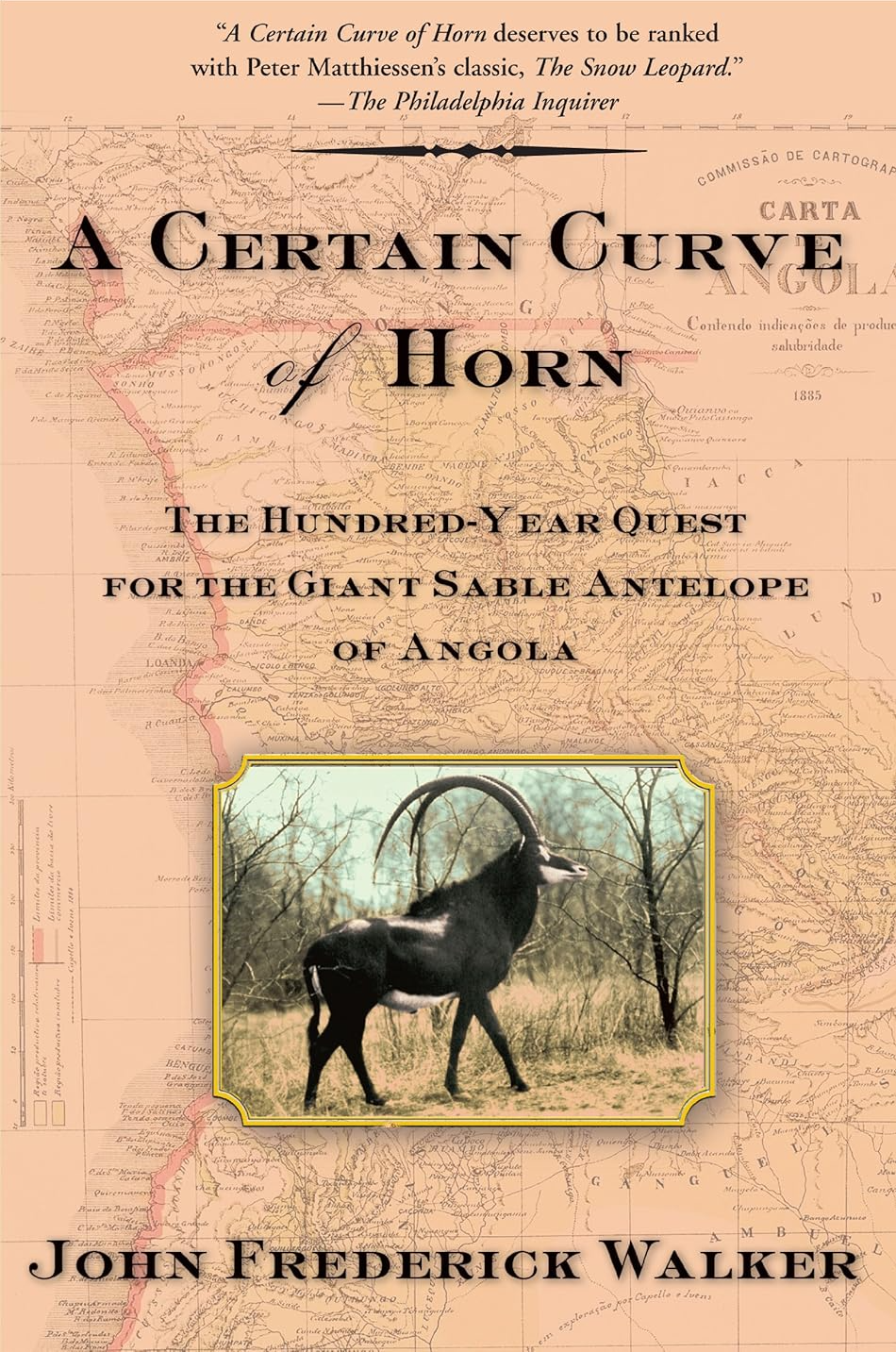
Cover of A Certain Curve of Horn by John F. Walker

The giant sable antelope has been the subject of notable works of journalism and natural history writing. Veteran journalist and Africa correspondent John Frederick Walker chronicled the animal's history and uncertain fate in his 2002 book A Certain Curve of Horn: The Hundred-Year Quest for the Giant Sable Antelope of Angola (Grove Atlantic). The book traces the subspecies from its discovery by British railway engineer Frank Varian in 1916, through decades of pursuit by big-game hunters and museum collectors, to its struggle for survival during Angola's 27-year civil war and the current threats from poaching and habitat loss. Walker participated in the first post-war expedition to find evidence that the giant sable had survived the conflict, and was on site for the first relocation and collaring operation in 2009. A revised and updated edition of the book chronicling these events was published by Grove Atlantic in 2011.

=== Visual Arts ===
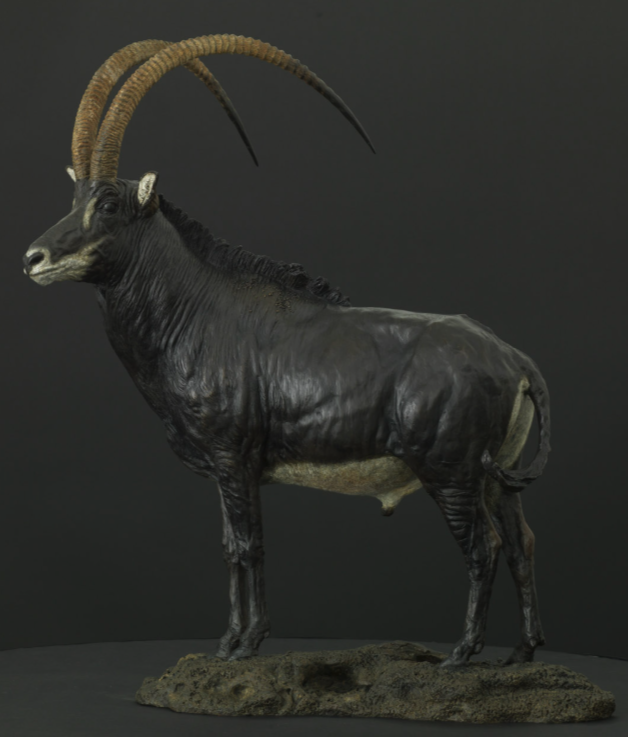
Giant sable bronze sculpture (Murray Grant)

In 2022, Kenyan wildlife sculptor Murray Grant (Murray Grant Bronzes) travelled to Angola to take measurements of a giant sable bull in order to create a bronze sculpture cast at one-third life size. Grant, who is based at El Karama Ranch in Kenya's Laikipia region, documented the process in a film narrated by the artist.

=== Cinematography ===
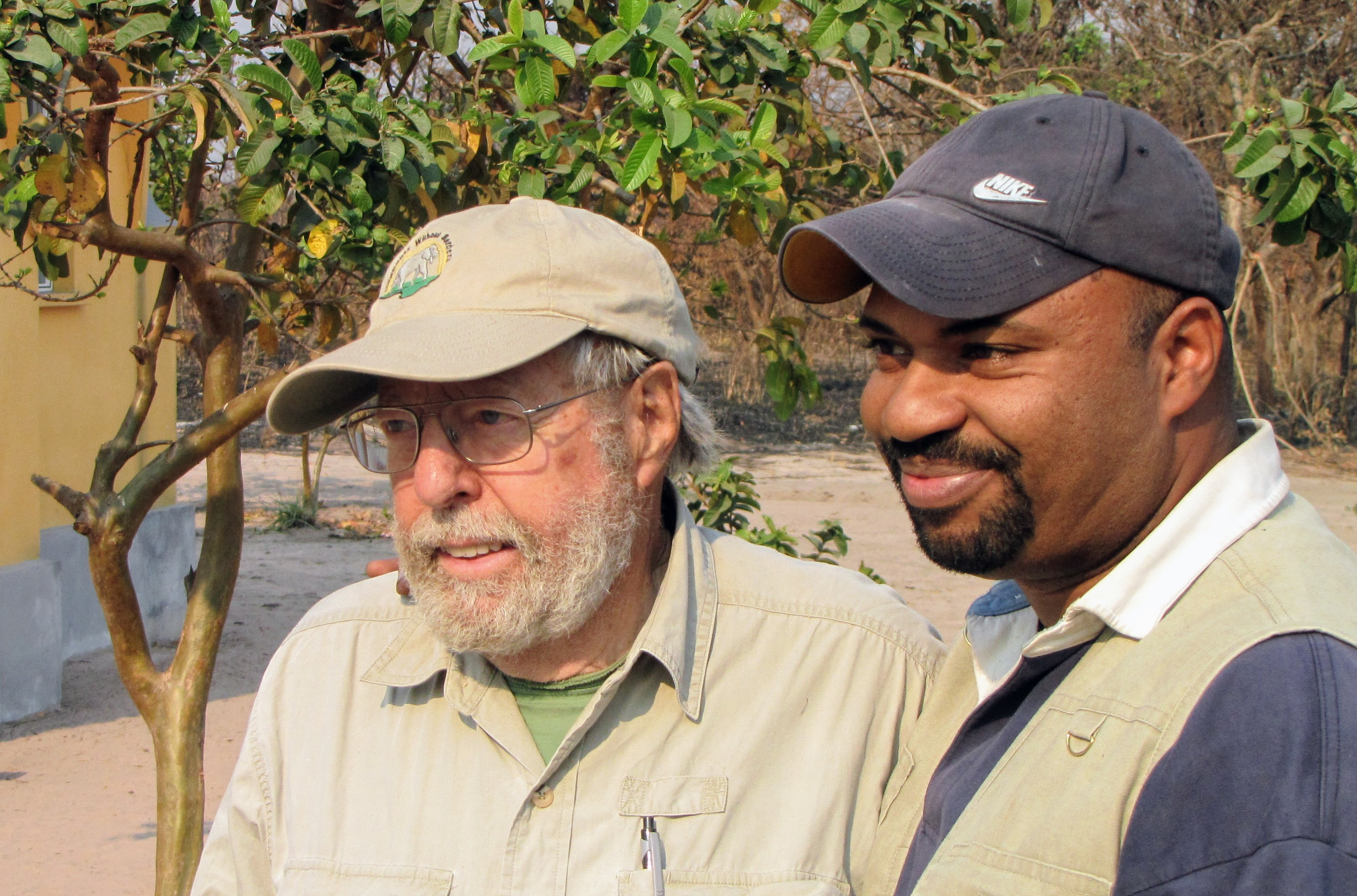
Giant sable researcher Dr. Richard Estes and filmmaker Kalunga Lima (Cangandala, 2009)

Angolan filmmaker Kalunga Lima documented Dr. Pedro Vaz Pinto's search for the giant sable over several months of fieldwork in Cangandala National Park and the Luando Reserve, culminating in the 2009 capture and relocation of a surviving bull and the collaring of a handful of animals in the reserve. The resulting documentary, Saving the Giant Sable Antelope, was shown as a 60-minute work-in-progress version at Expo 2010 in Shanghai. Lima died unexpectedly in December 2011, before the film could reach wider distribution. He had nearly completed the final edit at the time of his death. The film is made available in its unfinished version in English and Portuguese by the Giant Sable Fund for all interested in the conservation of this magnificent animal.
