= Bambi (disambiguation) =

Bambi is a 1942 Walt Disney animated drama film, centered around a young deer of the same name.

Bambi or BAMBI may also refer to:

== Arts and entertainment ==
=== Characters ===
- Bambi (character), the fawn in Salten's 1923 novel and works based on the novel
- J.D. (Scrubs), on the American comedy-drama Scrubs
- Bambi, a character in the animated TV series Robotboy
- Dr. Bambi Berenbaum, a character in The X-Files episode "War of the Coprophages"
- Bambi and Thumper, villains: Bambi portrayed by Lola Larson (Mary Hiller) and Donna Garrett, Thumper portrayed by Trina Parks, in the James Bond film Diamonds Are Forever

=== Film and television ===
- Bambi Award, a German television award
- Bambi II, a 2006 Disneytoon midquel to the 1942 film
- Bambi (2013 film), a French documentary profiling Marie-Pierre Pruvot
- Bambi: The Reckoning, a live-action horror film
- "Bambi" (The Young Ones), a 1984 episode of The Young Ones

=== Literature ===
- Bambi, a 1914 novel by American author Marjorie Benton Cooke
- Bambi, a Life in the Woods, the 1923 novel on which the Disney film is based, by Austro-Hungarian author Felix Salten

=== Music ===
- Bambi (Momus album), 2013
- Bambi (Hippo Campus album), 2018
- Bambi (EP) by South Korean singer Baekhyun, 2021
- "Bambi" (Baekhyun song), 2021
- "Bambi", a song by Prince on the album Prince, 1979
- "Bambi", a song by Tokyo Police Club on the album Champ, 2010
- "Bambi", a song by Jidenna on the album The Chief, 2017
- "Bambi", a song by Clairo on the album Sling, 2021

== People ==
=== Given name or surname ===
- Bambi Schieffelin (born 1945), American linguistic anthropologist
- Cosimo Bambi (born 1980), Italian physicist

=== Nickname, pseudonym, ring name or stage name ===
- Andy Burnham (born 1970), Prime Minister of the United Kingdom and Leader of the Labour Party since July 2026, sometimes nicknamed "Bambi Burnham"
- Bambi (artist), pseudonym of a British street artist, identity unknown
- Bambi (rapper), stage name of Polish rapper Michalina Włodarczyk (born 2003)
- Lance Alworth (born 1940), American football player
- Bambi Bembenek (1958–2010), American convicted murderer
- Sheila "Bambi" Caffell (died 1985), one of the murder victims of Jeremy Bamber (born 1961)
- Rachel Chalkowski (born 1939), Israeli midwife
- Bambi Hall, ring name of Canadian professional wrestler Samantha Hall (born 1992)
- Bambi Linn, American dancer, choreographer and actress Bambina Linnemeier (born 1926)
- Selina Majors (born 1967), American professional wrestler
- Jamal Musiala (born 2003), German professional footballer
- Marie-Pierre Pruvot (born 1935), French transgender entertainer and academic
- Bambi Lee Savage, stage name of American singer, songwriter and musician Shannon Strong (born 1963)
- Bambi Sheleg, Israeli journalist and founding editor of the magazine Eretz Acheret born Beatrice Ehrlich (1958–2016)
- Bambi Woods (born 1955), pornographic actress and exotic dancer best known as the title character of the 1978 film Debbie Does Dallas
- Bambi Zhu (Zhu Xudan, born 1992), Chinese actress

== Military ==
- Bambi, one of two Second World War oil pipeline systems built under the English Channel as part of Operation Pluto to supply Allied forces in Europe
- Project BAMBI (Ballistic Missile Boost Intercept), a proposed American anti-ballistic missile system
- Bambi-class tugboat, a class of two Royal Netherlands Navy tugboats

== Other uses ==
- BAMBI, a human gene
- Bambi, Angola, a commune in Chipindo, Huíla, Angola
- 15845 Bambi, an asteroid
- Bambi (company), a Serbian food manufacturing company
- Bambi, the name of the Fuldamobil automobile in Argentina
- BAMBI, callsign of Allied Air, a Nigerian cargo airline
- BAMBI, a charitable foundation established by Rachel Chalkowski
- Bambi (software) a high-level Bayesian model-building interface written in Python

== See also ==
- Bambii, Canadian music producer
- Bambee (Desirée Sparre-Enger, fl. c. 2000), Norwegian pop singer
- Bambie Thug, stage name of Irish singer songwriter and Eurovision contestant Bambie Ray Robinson (born 1994)
- Bamby (disambiguation)
