= List of cities and towns in Angola =

This is a list of cities and towns in Angola.

== List ==
| Name of town or city | Coordinates | Pop. 2014/18 | Province |
|---|---|---|---|
| Alto Cauale | 9°8′S 14°46′E | 104,000 | Uíge |
| Alto Hama | 12°14′S 15°33′E | 17,000 | Huambo |
| Alto Zambeze | 11°54′21″S 22°55′18″E | 20,000 | Moxico |
| Ambaca | 8°11′S 15°22′E | 61,769 | Cuanza Norte |
| Ambriz | 7.86°S 13.12°E | 11,640 | Bengo |
| Ambuila | 7°26′S 14°39′E | 18,118 | Uíge |
| Andulo | 11.48°S 16.69°E | 50,000 | Bié |
| Baía Farta | 12.61°S 13.19°E | 45,000 | Benguela |
| Bailundo | 12.19°S 15.86°E | 70,481 | Huambo |
| Balombo | 12.36°S 14.77°E | 36,361 | Benguela |
| Barra do Dande | 8°28′22″S 13°22′23″E | 75,000 | Bengo |
| Benguela | 12.58°S 13.40°E | 555,124 | Benguela |
| Bibala (Vila Arriaga) | 14.76°S 13.35°E | 10,500 | Namibe |
| Biula | 11.18°S 20.22°E | 4,381 | Lunda Sul |
| Bocoio | 12°27′S 14°09′E | 35,000 | Benguela |
| Buco-Zau | | 13,217 | Cabinda |
| Bungo | 7.44°S 15.39°E | 3,461 | Uíge |
| Caala(Kaala)(Kahala)(Robert Williams)(Vila Robert Williams) | 12°51′09″S 15°33′38″E | 130,000 | Huambo |
| Cabamba | 8.35°S 17.51°E | 4,109 | Malanje |
| Cabinda (Kabinda) (Tchiowa) | 5.56°S 12.19°E | 550,000 | Cabinda |
| Caboledo | 9.66°S 13.24°E | 3,966 | Bengo |
| Cacolo | 10.15°S 19.26°E | 13,498 | Lunda Sul |
| Caconda | 13.73°S 15.06°E | 15,000 | Huíla |
| Caculama | 9.48°S 16.85°E | 3,897 | Malanje |
| Cacuso | 9.43°S 15.74°E | 39,302 | Malanje |
| Cafunfo | 8.77°S 18.00°E | 90,000 | Lunda Norte |
| Cahama | 16.29°S 14.30°E | 12,767 | Cunene |
| Caiengue | 12.43°S 15.71°E | 3,883 | Huambo |
| Caimbambo | 13.03°S 14.01°E | 14,544 | Benguela |
| Calai | 12.87°S 15.58°E | 8,741 | Cuando Cubango |
| Calandala | 9.21°S 17.98°E | 5,386 | Lunda Norte |
| Calandula | | 9,000 | Malanje |
| Calenga (Kalenga) | 12.85°S 15.47°E | 13,082 | Huambo |
| Calonda | 8.47°S 20.55°E | 3,944 | Lunda Norte |
| Calucinga | 11.32°S 16.20°E | 15,000 | Bié |
| Calulo | 10.00°S 14.90°E | 44,000 | Cuanza Sul |
| Caluquembe (Kalukembe) | 13.78°S 14.78°E | 31,000 | Huíla |
| Camabatela | 8.19°S 15.37°E | 21,767 | Cuanza Norte |
| Camacupa (General Machado, Vila General Machado) | 12.02°S 17.47°E | 59,000 | Bié |
| Camanongue (Buçaco, Kamenongue) | 11.44°S 20.16°E | 12,930 | Moxico |
| Camaxilo | 8.34°S 18.91°E | 4,639 | Lunda Norte |
| Cambambe | 8.37°S 17.67°E | 4,302 | Lunda Norte |
| Cambongue | 15.15°S 12.17°E | 3,638 | Namibe |
| Cambundi (Nova Gaia, Catembo) | 10.08°S 17.55°E | 17,212 | Malanje |
| Camissombo (Veríssimo Sarmento) | 8.16°S 20.66°E | 3,649 | Lunda Norte |
| Candjimbe | 12.27°S 15.23°E | 6,401 | Huambo |
| Cangamba (Vila de Aljustrel) | 13.70°S 19.86°E | 3,414 | Moxico |
| Cangandala | 9.79°S 16.43°E | 16,232 | Malanje |
| Cangumbe | 11.96°S 19.20°E | 4,849 | Moxico |
| Capelongo (Cubango, Kuvango) | 14.47°S 16.29°E | 11,098 | Huíla |
| Capenda Camulemba | 9.42°S 18.43°E | 3,562 | Lunda Norte |
| Capulo | 7.95°S 13.17°E | 13,157 | Bengo |
| Cassanguidi (Cassanguide) | 7.49°S 21.30°E | 20,000 | Lunda Norte |
| Cassongue | 11.85°S 15.05°E | 4,682 | Cuanza Sul |
| Catabola (Katabola, Chissamba, Nova Sintra) | 12.15°S 17.28°E | 28,831 | Bié |
| Catacanha | 8.06°S 13.23°E | 5,635 | Bengo |
| Catchiungo (Katchiungo, Katchungo, Cantchiungo) | 12.56°S 16.22°E | 26,974 | Huambo |
| Catumbela | 12.43°S 13.55°E | 95,034 | Benguela |
| Caungula | 8.08°S 19.08°E | | Lunda Norte |
| Caxita Cameia | 8.42°S 17.45°E | 11,013 | Malanje |
| Caxito | 8.58°S 13.66°E | 55,000 | Bengo |
| Cazaje (Cazage) | 11.07°S 20.71°E | 6,539 | Lunda Sul |
| Cazombo | 11.89°S 22.90°E | 34,000 | Moxico |
| Cela | 11.42°S 15.12°E | 90,000 | Cuanza Sul |
| Chiange (Gambos) | 15.74°S 13.89°E | 4,152 | Huíla |
| Chibanda | 12.16°S 16.75°E | 4,846 | Bié |
| Chibemba | 15.75°S 14.08°E | 3,741 | Huíla |
| Chibia | 15.19°S 13.69°E | 10,000 | Huíla |
| Chicala | 11.94°S 19.63°E | 3,523 | Moxico |
| Chicomba | 14°8′S 14°55′E | 9,428 | Huila |
| Chinguar | 12°33′S 16°20′E | 26,811 | Bie |
| Chingufo | 7.62°S 20.53°E | 3,903 | Lunda Norte |
| Chipindo | 13.83°S 15.80°E | 10,000 | Huíla |
| Chissamba | 12.165°S 17.322°E | 7,677 | Bié |
| Chitado | 17.32°S 13.92°E | 3,656 | Cunene |
| Chitembo | 13.52°S 16.75°E | 25,000 | Bié |
| Chongoroi | 13°34′S 13°57′E | 12,000 | Benguela |
| Coemba | 12.15°S 18.09°E | 4,608 | Bié |
| Colui (Candingo) | 14.52°S 16.00°E | 5,093 | Huíla |
| Conda | 11.11°S 14.34°E | 21,260 | Cuanza Sul |
| Cota | 9.27°S 16.10°E | 4,677 | Malanje |
| Coutada | 17.02°S 21.30°E | 3,821 | Cuando Cubango |
| Cuangar | 17.61°S 18.62°E | 3,897 | Cuando Cubango |
| Cuango-Luzamba (Kwango, Luzamba, Cuango) | 9.12°S 18.04°E | 11,709 | Lunda Norte |
| Cuasa | 11.35°S 21.82°E | 3,518 | Moxico |
| Cubal | 13.04°S 14.24°E | 41,142 | Benguela |
| Cuchi | 14.66°S 16.89°E | 16,274 | Cuando Cubango |
| Cuilo | 8.24°S 19.52°E | 3,890 | Lunda Norte |
| Cuima | 13.24°S 15.64°E | 6,546 | Huambo |
| Cuimba | 6.12°S 14.62°E | 13,927 | Zaire |
| Cuito Cuanavale | 15.16°S 19.17°E | 8,702 | Cuando Cubango |
| Cuvelai | 15.66°S 15.80°E | 5,737 | Cunene |
| Dala | 11.03°S 20.20°E | 4,168 | Lunda Sul |
| Damba | 6.68°S 15.13°E | 3,827 | Uíge |
| Didimbo | 17°30′S 21°45′E | | Cuando Cubango |
| Dombe Grande | 12.95°S 13.10°E | 18,208 | Benguela |
| Dondo | 9.69°S 14.43°E | 30,338 | Cuanza Norte |
| Dongo | 14.59°S 15.73°E | 9,134 | Huíla |
| Dundo (Chitato) | 7.38°S 20.83°E | 40,055 | Lunda Norte |
| Ekunha (Vila Flor) | 12.68°S 15.51°E | 5,948 | Cunene |
| Folgares | 14.89°S 15.08°E | 6,380 | Huíla |
| Funda | 8.85°S 13.55°E | 3,479 | Bengo |
| Gabela | 10.85°S 14.37°E | 4,442 | Cuanza Sul |
| Galo | 11.35°S 14.34°E | 5,241 | Cuanza Sul |
| Ganda | 13.03°S 14.63°E | 26,118 | Benguela |
| Golungo Alto | 9.14°S 14.77°E | 7,142 | Cuanza Norte |
| Guri | 8.39°S 17.69°E | 3,583 | Lunda Norte |
| Huambo (Nova Lisboa) | 12.77°S 15.74°E | 333,387 | Huambo |
| Humpata | 15.01°S 13.37°E | 4,122 | Huíla |
| Jamba | 17.46°S 22.61°E | | Cuando Cubango |
| Jamba | 14.69°S 16.06°E | | Huíla |
| Kuito (Bié, Silva Porto) | 12.38°S 16.94°E | 180,764 | Bié |
| Leúa | 11.65°S 20.44°E | 5,411 | Moxico |
| Lobito | 12.36°S 13.53°E | 145,652 | Benguela |
| Lombe | 9.49°S 16.15°E | 3,619 | Malanje |
| Longa | 14.61°S 18.48°E | 3,403 | Cuando Cubango |
| Longonjo | 12.91°S 15.25°E | 5,259 | Huambo |
| Luacano (Dilolo) | 11.22°S 21.65°E | 7,179 | Moxico |
| Luanda (Loanda, São Paulo de Loanda) | 8.82°S 13.24°E | 2,583,981 | Luanda |
| Luau | 10.62°S 14.97°E | 113,722 | Cuanza Sul |
| Luau (Vila Teixeira de Sousa) | 10.71°S 22.23°E | 7,951 | Moxico |
| Lubango (Sá da Bandeira) | 14.91°S 13.49°E | 250,921 | Huíla |
| Lucala | 9.27°S 15.24°E | 3,849 | Cuanza Norte |
| Lucapa (Lukapa) | 8.42°S 20.74°E | 27,236 | Lunda Norte |
| Lucusse | 12.53°S 20.81°E | 3,542 | Moxico |
| Luena (Lwena, Luso, Vila Luso) | 11.79°S 19.90°E | 84,619 | Moxico |
| Luiana | 17.37°S 23.00°E | 3,577 | Cuando Cubango |
| Luimbale (Londuimbali) | 12.24°S 15.31°E | 5,390 | Huambo |
| Luma Cassao | 11.24°S 19.76°E | 3,597 | Lunda Sul |
| Lumbala N'guimbo (Lumbala) | 14.10°S 21.44°E | 3,936 | Moxico |
| Lumeje | 11.56°S 20.78°E | 3,591 | Moxico |
| Luremo | 8.52°S 17.83°E | 3,890 | Lunda Norte |
| Luxilo | 7.59°S 21.35°E | 3,785 | Lunda Norte |
| Lândana (Cacongo) | 5.23°S 12.14°E | 16,783 | Cabinda |
| M'Bimbi (Bimbe) | 11.82°S 15.82°E | 3,463 | Huambo |
| Malanje (Malange) | 9.54°S 16.34°E | 156,829 | Malanje |
| Malembo | 5.34°S 12.19°E | 7,382 | Cabinda |
| Maludi | 8.02°S 21.29°E | 5,918 | Lunda Norte |
| Marimba | 8.36°S 17.02°E | 4,691 | Malanje |
| Marimbanguengo | 8.17°S 17.49°E | 4,371 | Malanje |
| Massango | 8.04°S 16.34°E | 4,302 | Malanje |
| Matala | 14.74°S 15.03°E | 33,231 | Huíla |
| Mavinga | 15.79°S 20.36°E | 4,442 | Cuando Cubango |
| Mbanza-Congo (M'banza-Kongo, São Salvador, São Salvador do Congo) | 6.27°S 14.24°E | 30,768 | Zaire |
| Menongue (Vila Serpa, Pinto, Serpa Pinto) | 14.66°S 17.69°E | 31,445 | Cuando Cubango |
| Muchinda | 9.33°S 18.19°E | 3,695 | Lunda Norte |
| Muconda (Nova Chaves) | 10.60°S 21.32°E | 3,506 | Lunda Sul |
| Mucumbo | 7.39°S 21.14°E | 4,846 | Lunda Norte |
| Mucusso | 18.02°S 21.43°E | 3,959 | Cuando Cubango |
| Mucussueje | 11.03°S 21.94°E | 5,643 | Moxico |
| Muginga | 8.35°S 17.60°E | 10,063 | Lunda Norte |
| Mulondo | 15.65°S 15.20°E | 5,065 | Huíla |
| Mungo | 11.84°S 16.22°E | 6,643 | Huambo |
| Munhango | 12.16°S 18.55°E | 4,022 | Moxico |
| Mussende | 10.51°S 16.01°E | 12,372 | Cuanza Sul |
| Musserra (Mafuca) | 7.54°S 13.01°E | 4,060 | Zaire |
| Mussuco | 8.40°S 17.72°E | 9,467 | Lunda Norte |
| N'dalatando (Vila Salazar) | 9.30°S 14.91°E | 45,295 | Cuanza Norte |
| N'zeto (Nzeto, Ambrizete) | 7.23°S 12.86°E | 10,479 | Zaire |
| Namacunde (Santa Clara) | 17.30°S 15.84°E | 3,479 | Cunene |
| Moçâmedes | 15.19°S 12.16°E | 89,442 | Namibe |
| Negage | 7.76°S 15.27°E | 37,622 | Uíge |
| Nharea | 11.48°S 16.97°E | 9,496 | Bié |
| Nóqui | 5.88°S 13.43°E | 3,741 | Zaire |
| Nzagi (Andrada) | 7.69°S 21.37°E | 22,981 | Lunda Norte |
| Ondjiva | 17.07°S 15.73°E | 19,099 | Cunene |
| Pinheiro | 12.80°S 15.64°E | 4,713 | Huambo |
| Porto Amboim (Gunza) | 10.73°S 13.76°E | 8,755 | Cuanza Sul |
| Quela | 9.27°S 17.07°E | 3,543 | Malanje |
| Quibala (Kibala) | 10.73°S 14.98°E | 4,406 | Cuanza Sul |
| Quibaxe | 8.50°S 14.59°E | 4,261 | Cuanza Norte |
| Quicombo (Kikombo) | 11.32°S 13.82°E | 4,847 | Cuanza Sul |
| Quilengues | 14.08°S 14.08°E | 6,427 | Huíla |
| Quimavongo | 7.62°S 13.03°E | 15,741 | Zaire |
| Quimbango | 10.96°S 17.57°E | 4,004 | Malanje |
| Quimbele | 6.52°S 16.22°E | 8,055 | Uíge |
| Quipungo (Gambos) | 14.83°S 14.55°E | 6,817 | Huíla |
| Quirima | 10.90°S 18.08°E | 6,427 | Huíla |
| Sacomar, (Saco-Mar, Saco Mar) | 15.12°S 12.20°E | 5,988 | Namibe |
| Samunona | 8.55°S 20.50°E | 3,910 | Lunda Norte |
| Saurimo(Henrique de Carvalho) | 9.66°S 20.39°E | 78,417 | Lunda Sul |
| Savate (Candingo) | 16.85°S 17.98°E | 4,371 | Cuando Cubango |
| Savungo | 10.41°S 18.72°E | 4,094 | Lunda Sul |
| Songo | 7.35°S 14.85°E | 7,633 | Uíge |
| Soyo (Santo António do Zaire) | 6.13°S 12.37°E | 75,224 | Zaire |
| Sumbe (Novo Redondo) | 11.21°S 13.85°E | 50,458 | Cuanza Sul |
| Tchindjenje (Quingenge) | 12.82°S 14.93°E | 6,304 | Huambo |
| Tchipelongo | 16.49°S 14.62°E | 3,733 | Cunene |
| Techamutete (Chamutete) | 15.25°S 16.07°E | 4,348 | Huíla |
| Tentativa | 8.60°S 13.60°E | 3,760 | Bengo |
| Tombua (Tomboa, Tombwa, Tombwe, Porto Alexandre) | 15.80°S 11.86°E | 7,256 | Namibe |
| Tumba | 7.42°S 21.03°E | 4,737 | Lunda Norte |
| Uku (Vila Nova do Seles) | 11.40°S 14.31°E | 28,466 | Cuanza Sul |
| Ukuma (Cuma) | 12.85°S 15.07°E | 11,533 | Huambo |
| Uíge (Uije, Carmona, Vila Marechal Carmona) | 7.62°S 15.05°E | 116,751 | Uíge |
| Viana | 8.90°S 13.37°E | | Luanda |
| Waku Kungo (Waku Kundo, Santa Comba, Buandangue, Uaco Cungo) | 11.36°S 15.12°E | 26,948 | Cuanza Sul |
| Xangongo (Vila Roçades) | 16.74°S 14.97°E | 8,125 | Cunene |
| Xá-Muteba | 9.52°S 17.82°E | 3,447 | Lunda Norte |

== Images ==
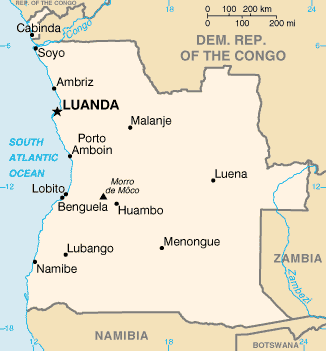
Map of Angola

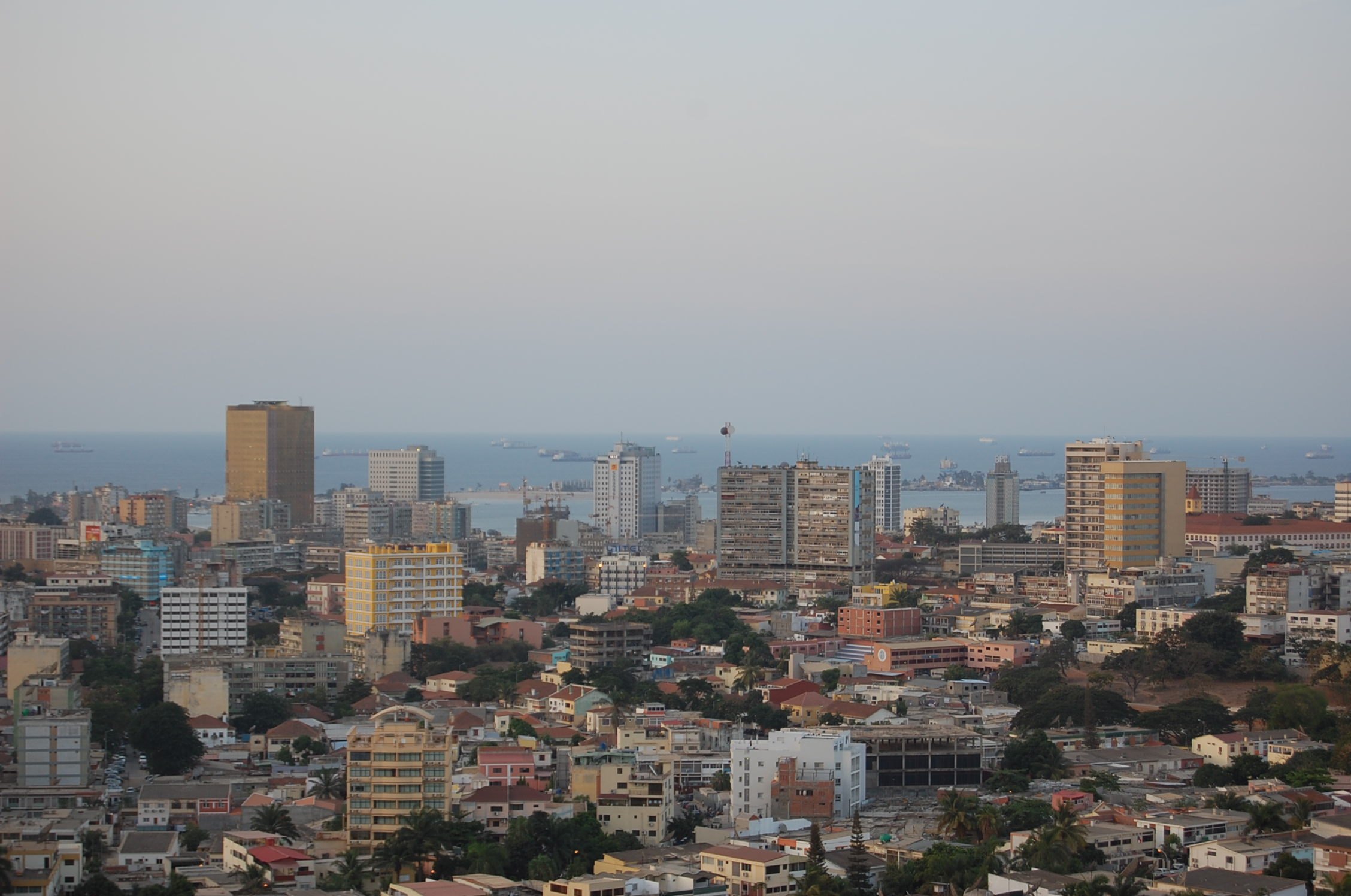
Luanda, Capital of Angola

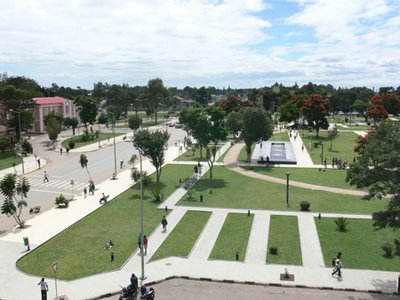
Huambo

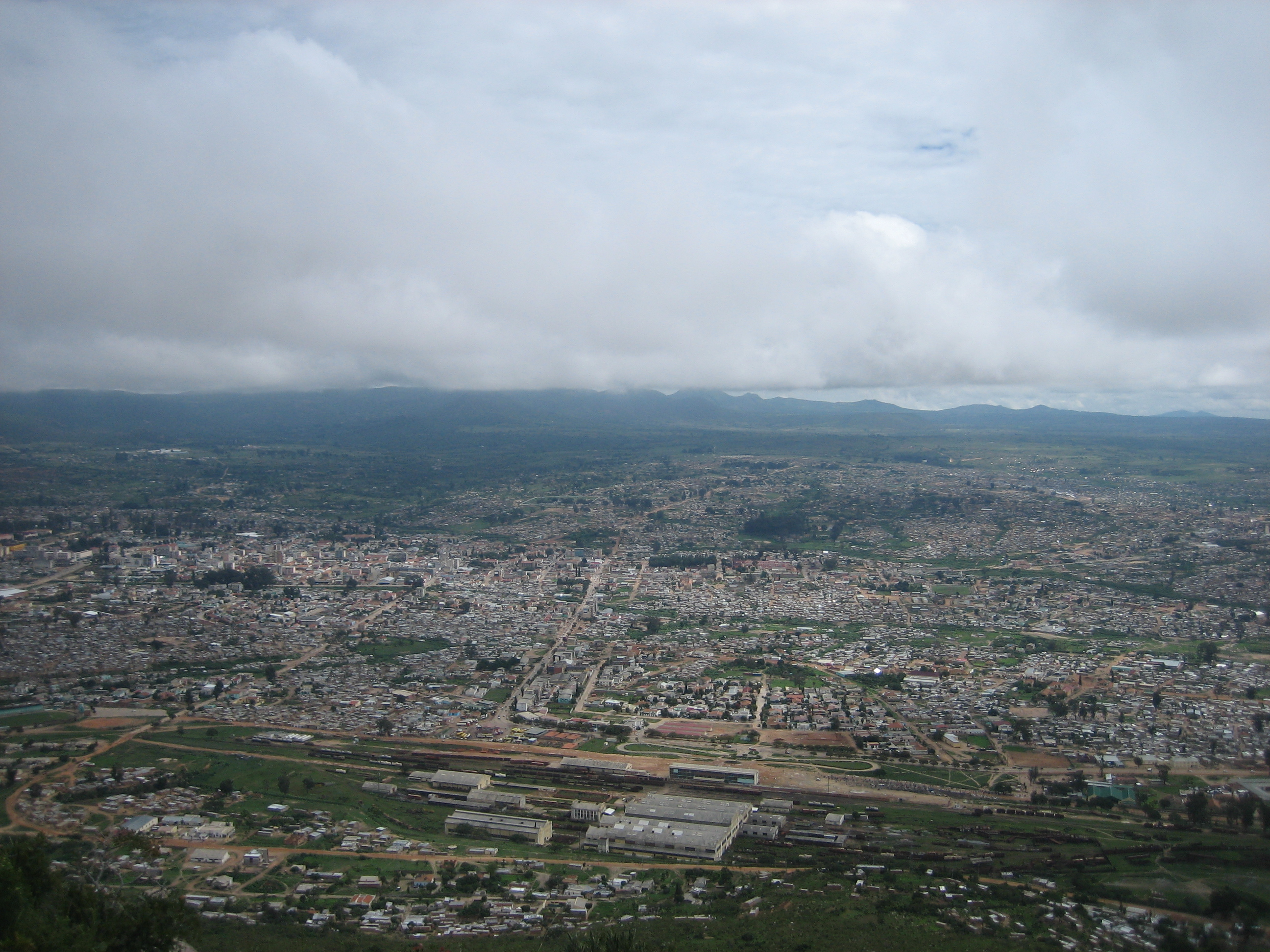
Lubango

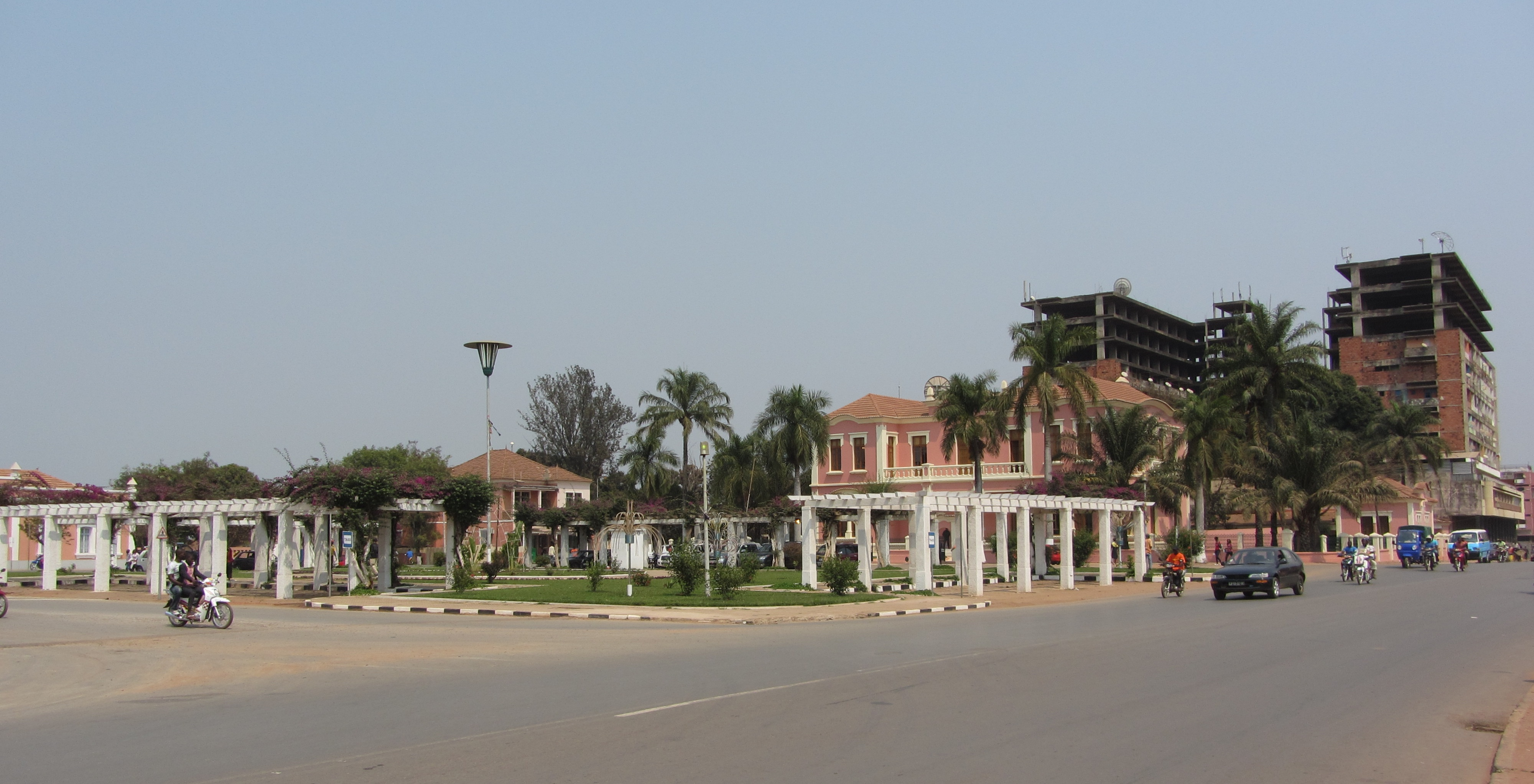
Malanje

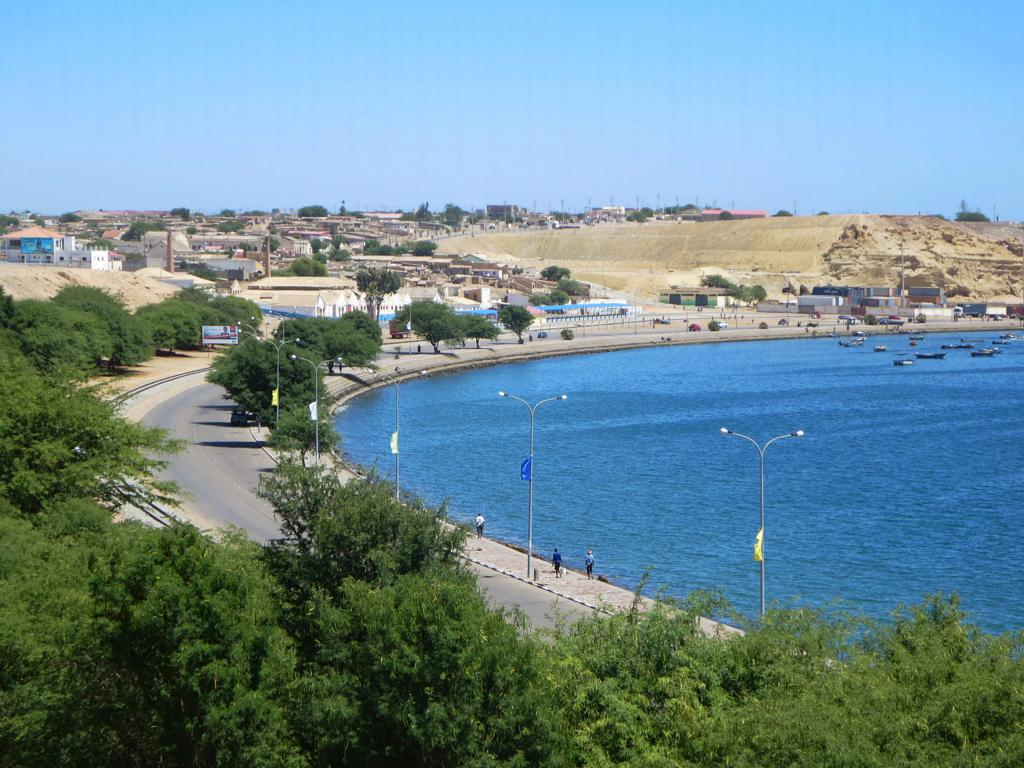
Moçâmedes waterfront

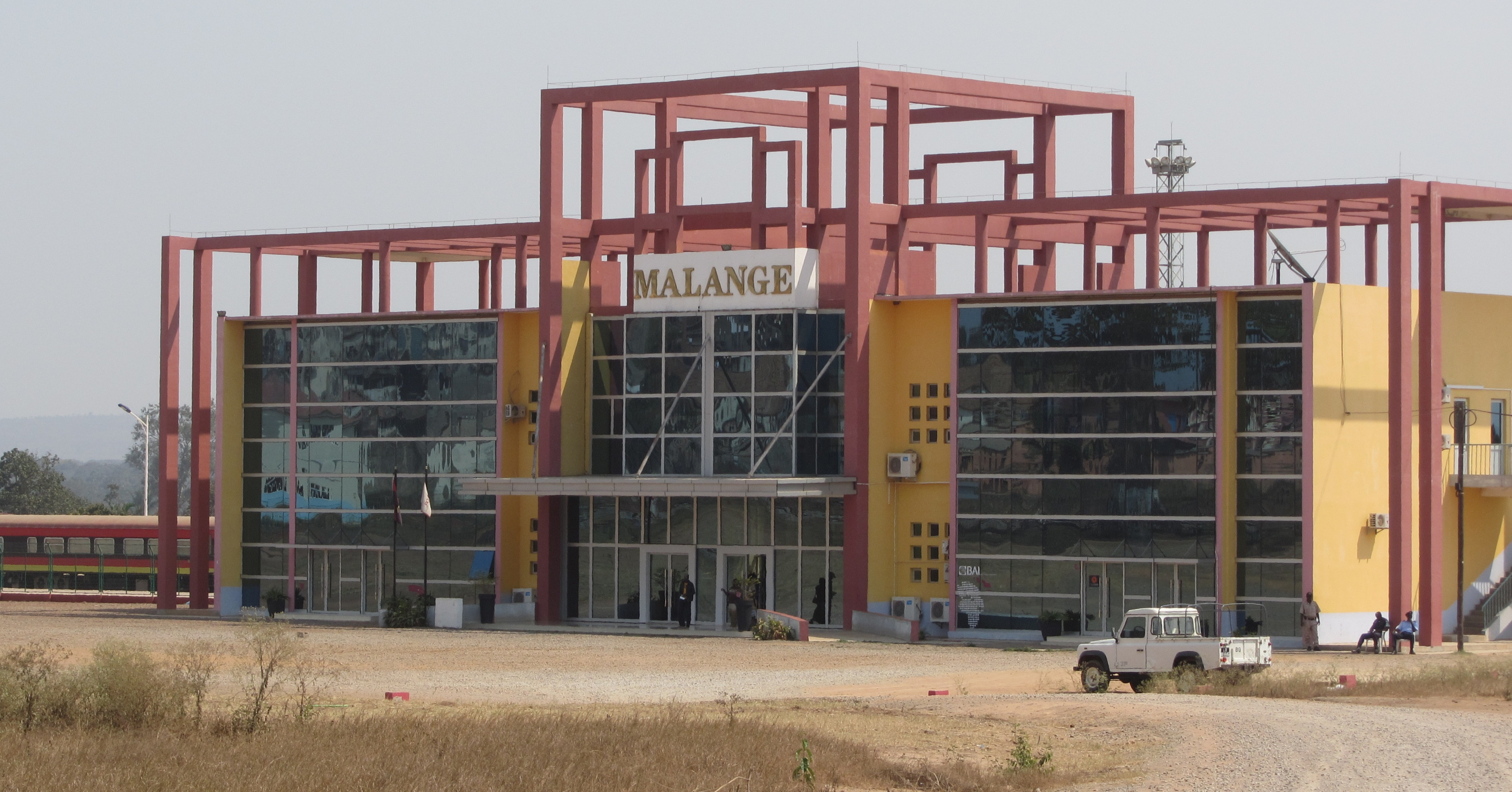
Railway station of Malanje

== Bibliography ==
- Ilídio do Amaral [in Portuguese] (1978). "Contribuição para o conhecimento do fenómeno de urbanização em Angola" [Contribution towards the study of urbanization in Angola]. Finisterra (in Portuguese). 13 (25). Centro de Estudos Geográficos da Universidade de Lisboa. ISSN 0430-5027.
