= Elias Piedoso Chimuco =

Angolan businessman and philanthropist

Elias Chimuco
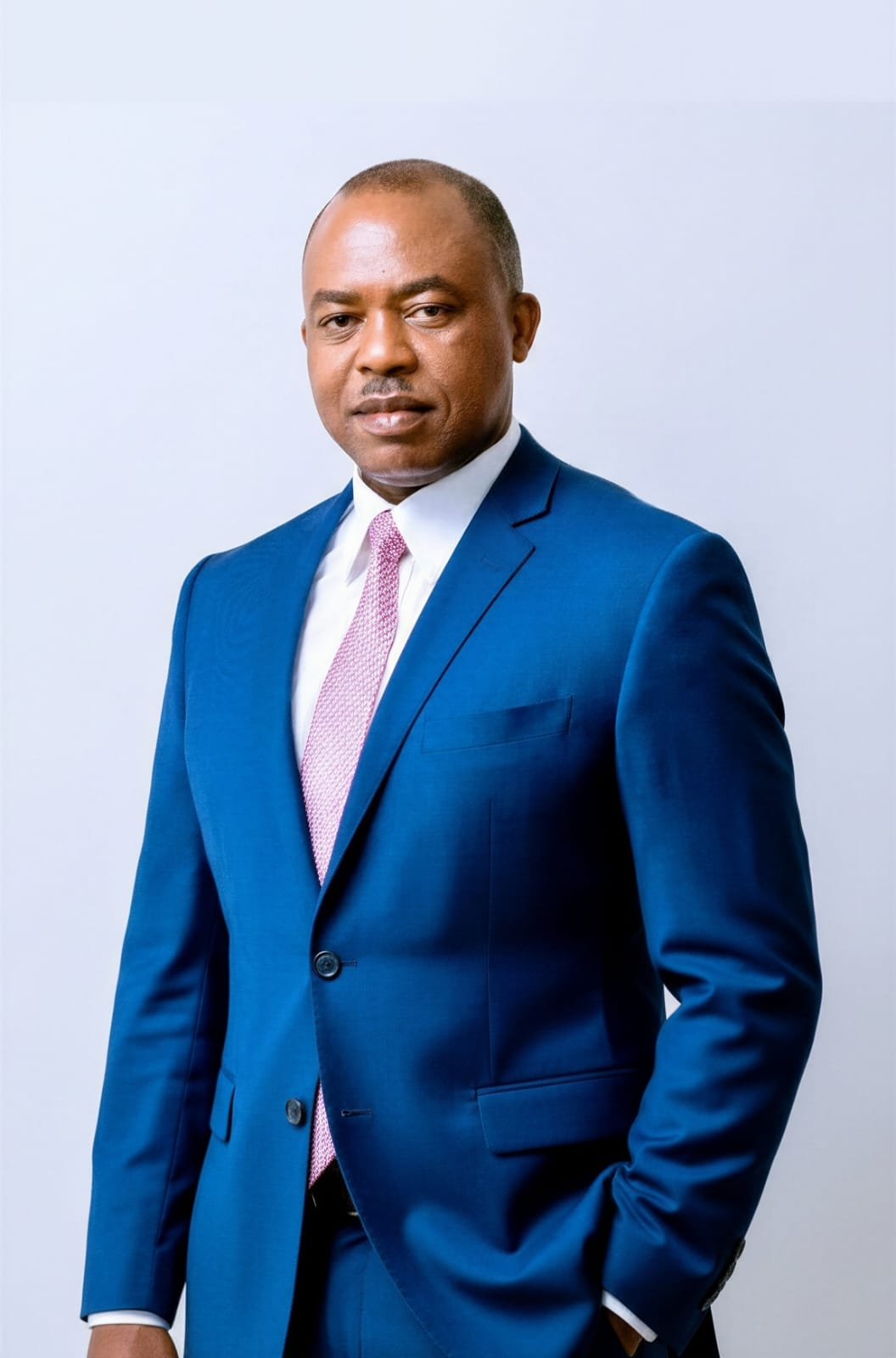

Personal details
- Born: Elias Piedoso Chimuco; 4 December 1969 (age 56) Katchiungo, Huambo Province, Angola
- Citizenship: Angolan
- Occupation: Businessman, philanthropist, politician and diplomat
- Website: fundacaopiedoso.ao

Elias Piedoso Chimuco (born 4 December 1969) is an Angolan businessman, philanthropist, politician and diplomat. He is the founder and chairman of the Board of Trustees of the Fundação Piedoso, honorary president of Grupo Chicoil S.A., chairman of the Board of the General Assembly of Banco YETU S.A., and owner of the Universidade Independente de Angola (UnIA).

== Biography ==
=== Early life and education ===
Elias Piedoso Chimuco was born on 4 December 1969 in the municipality of Katchiungo, Huambo Province, the son of Horácio Chimuco and Aurora Cassinda.

He holds a master's degree in business management from the Lusófona University of Humanities and Technologies in Portugal (2012–2013), and a postgraduate diploma in Public Administration and Public Economic Law from the Instituto Superior de Gestão (ISG) in Lisbon (2013). In Angola, he completed a master's degree in public administration at the Agostinho Neto University (2014–2015). Since 2022, he has been pursuing a PhD in public policy at the University of Aveiro in Portugal.

=== Business career ===
Elias Chimuco's business career began in 1989 as an administrative manager at Vinevala Comercial & Filhos, Lda. On 14 December 1991, he founded in Lobito the company Chimuco Comercial e Filhos, Lda., initially focused on general trade and food distribution. The company evolved on 27 September 1993 into "Chimuco Comercial Industrial, Lda.", from which the acronym "Chicoil" is derived.

Through diversification, new companies were incorporated into the holding, forming Grupo Chicoil S.A., a conglomerate operating in the hospitality, construction, private security, agribusiness, real estate and transport sectors. Chimuco served as administrator from 1992 to 1997, as chairman of the board from 1998 to 2011, and has held the position of honorary president since 2013. In 2009, the Chicoil Group was investing US$200 million in the construction of five hotels in the provinces of Huíla, Namibe, Benguela and Lunda Sul.

In the banking sector, Elias Chimuco is chairman of the Board of the General Assembly and majority shareholder of Banco YETU S.A., an institution founded in June 2014 which began operations in September 2015.

In higher education, he is the owner of the Universidade Independente de Angola (UnIA), based in Luanda, which has graduated over eight thousand students and was reinaugurated in December 2023 in the presence of former Cape Verdean President Jorge Carlos Fonseca. He also owns the Instituto Superior Politécnico Privado de Menongue (ISPPM) in Cuando Cubango Province, and chairs the Board of the General Assembly of DEA – Desenvolvimento do Ensino em Angola (Development of Education in Angola). He has established international academic partnerships, including agreements with the Instituto Superior de Ciências Jurídicas e Sociais (ISCJS) in Cape Verde and with universities in Brazil.

=== Political career ===
In 2012, Elias Chimuco was elected as a member of the National Assembly for the Movimento Popular de Libertação de Angola (MPLA), representing the provincial constituency of Cuando Cubango. He is a member of the MPLA Central Committee.

=== Diplomatic activity ===
Since 2011, Elias Chimuco has served as honorary consul of the Republic of Namibia in Angola. In April 2024, he was accredited for a second term in this role, covering the provinces of Benguela, Huíla and Cuando Cubango, with responsibility for safeguarding the interests of Namibian citizens in Angola and handling diplomatic matters between the two countries.

In March 2025, he was received by South African President Cyril Ramaphosa on the sidelines of an African National Congress (ANC) Central Committee meeting to discuss strategic investments in the automotive industry and other projects of mutual interest between Angola and South Africa.

== Philanthropy ==
=== Red Cross of Angola ===
In 2000, Elias Chimuco assumed the role of vice-president of the Red Cross of Angola.

=== Fundação Piedoso ===
On 19 April 2012, he founded the Fundação Piedoso, a private philanthropic institution of public utility, headquartered in Menongue, Cuando Cubango Province. The foundation was officially recognised by presidential decree no. 85/15 on 16 October 2015 and began its activities on 4 December 2015.

The foundation's mission is the implementation of social programmes in the areas of education, healthcare and vocational training, aimed at improving the living conditions of children, young people and vulnerable families in Angola. It operates in several provinces, including Cunene, Huambo, Cuando Cubango, Cuanza Norte, Bié and Bengo.

In August 2023, the foundation donated a residence to the Bunjei mission of the Evangelical Congregational Church in Angola (IECA), located in the municipality of Chipindo, Huíla Province, as part of the celebrations marking the mission's centenary jubilee.

== See also ==
- Fundação Piedoso
- Universidade Independente de Angola
- MPLA
- Cuando Cubango Province
