= Chipindo =

- Municipality and town
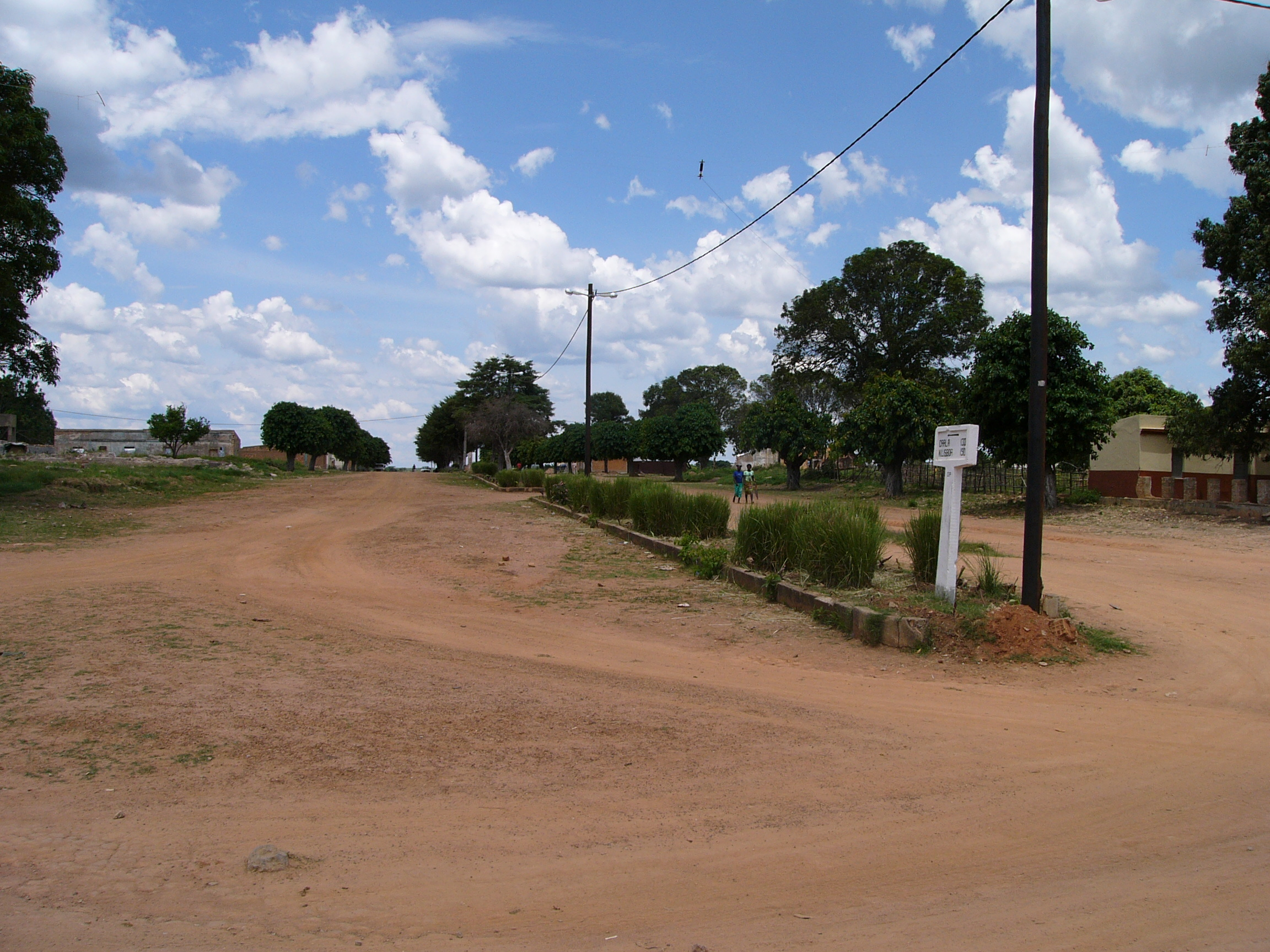

- Location in Angola
- Coordinates: 13°49′28″S 15°48′0″E
- Country: Angola
- Province: Huíla

Area
  - Municipality and town: 1,559 sq mi (4,038 km^{2})

Population (2014 Census)
  - Municipality and town: 64,714
  - Density: 41.51/sq mi (16.03/km^{2})
  - Urban: 10,000
- Time zone: UTC+1 (WAT)
- Climate: Cwb

Chipindo is a town and municipality, with a population of 64,714 (2014 census), in the province of Huíla, Angola.

It is situated 450 km North of Lubango, Huila province capital.

== Geography ==
With an extension of 4.038 km2, and a population density of 19 per km2, it is limited with the towns of Caála and Tchicala Tcholoanga in Huambo Province in the North, with Jamba town in the South, with Kuvango in the East and with Caconda and Chicomba in the West.

Its population is 64,714 at the 2014 census, distributed in two communes, Chipindo Sede and Bambi, that are constituted by seven regedorías, Tchitata, Camoanha, Sangueve, Capembe e Bundjei (Chipindo Sede), Catapua, Bambi sede (Bambi), and a great number of aldeias in each comuna. During the raining season traffic is strongly reduced due to the bad shape of the roads.

It has a small landing runway.

=== Climate ===
Chipindo has a subtropical highland climate (Köppen: Cwb) with two differentiated seasons, a wet season from October to April and a dry season from May to September. Temperatures are somewhat lower during the dry season.

Climate data for Chipindo
Month	Jan	Feb	Mar	Apr	May	Jun	Jul	Aug	Sep	Oct	Nov	Dec	Year
Mean daily maximum °C (°F)	26.0 (78.8)	26.0 (78.8)	26.1 (79.0)	26.6 (79.9)	25.5 (77.9)	24.2 (75.6)	24.5 (76.1)	27.2 (81.0)	29.6 (85.3)	28.9 (84.0)	27.2 (81.0)	26.0 (78.8)	26.5 (79.7)
Daily mean °C (°F)	20.1 (68.2)	20.2 (68.4)	20.3 (68.5)	20.1 (68.2)	17.6 (63.7)	15.6 (60.1)	15.4 (59.7)	18.1 (64.6)	21.0 (69.8)	21.5 (70.7)	20.7 (69.3)	20.1 (68.2)	19.2 (66.6)
Mean daily minimum °C (°F)	14.2 (57.6)	14.4 (57.9)	14.5 (58.1)	13.6 (56.5)	9.7 (49.5)	7.0 (44.6)	6.4 (43.5)	9.0 (48.2)	12.5 (54.5)	14.2 (57.6)	14.3 (57.7)	14.2 (57.6)	12.0 (53.6)
Average precipitation mm (inches)	190 (7.5)	162 (6.4)	228 (9.0)	115 (4.5)	10 (0.4)	0 (0)	0 (0)	0 (0)	5 (0.2)	69 (2.7)	147 (5.8)	196 (7.7)	1,122 (44.2)
Source: Climate-Data.org

== Population ==
Mother tongue of most of the population is Umbundu, spoken by the majority of Umbundu people, although it exist a part of the population belonging to Gangela people, especially in the West, close to Kuvango. The population is in its majority of strong traditional beliefs.

== Administration ==
Since the end of the war, for the first time in 14 years, since March 19, 2002, a local administration was established.

=== COMUNAS ===
- CHIPINDO SEDE: town center. Local Administration, police, Catholic church, Health center, School and Hospital (under construction in 2004). Aldea de Mbuandangui: 2 km from Chipindo sede, Action Against Hunger base (as of 2005). Regidurias: Sangueve, Camoanha, Tchitata, Capembe and Bundjei.
- BAMBI: South of the town. Health post.

Regidurias: Catapua, Bambi sede.

=== SECTOR ===
- Bundjei: North of the town. Health center.
