= Mulondo =

Mulondo may refer to

- Mulondo, Lanao del Sur, a municipality in the province of Lanao del Sur, Philippines
- Mulondo, Angola, a town in Angola
- Mulondo of Buganda, a 16th-century African ruler
- Besueri Kiwanuka Lusse Mulondo (born 1926), Ugandan politician
