= Amélia Calumbo Quinta =

Angolan politician

Amélia Calumbo Quinta was an Angolan politician for the MPLA and a member of the National Assembly of Angola beginning September 28, 2017 and ending with her death on March 2, 2023 due to illness.

Quinta graduated with a degree in psychology. She worked for the Organization of Angolan Women (OMA) as its municipal secretary in Cuembra and provincial secretary and coordinator in Bié.
