= Quilengues =

- Municipality and town
- Location in Angola
- Coordinates: 14°04′53″S 14°05′35″E
- Country: Angola
- Province: Huíla

Population (2014 Census)
  - Total: 75,334
- Time zone: UTC+1 (WAT)
- Climate: Aw

Quilengues, also Kilenjes, is a town and municipality in Huíla Province in Angola. The municipality had a population of 75,334 in 2014.

== Geography ==
Quilengues sits on the western edge of the Central Highlands, and is bordered to the north by the municipality of Chongoroi, the east by the municipality of Caluquembe, the south by the cities of Lubango and Cacula, and to the west by the municipalities of Bibala and Camucuio.

== Economy ==
The main activities are agriculture, trade and livestock.

== History ==
Quilengues was colonized by the Portuguese from 1770. It served as a gateway for the slave trade, and expanded the trade to the southeast of Angola on to the Kunene River. Quilengues became a municipality on July 1, 1870.
