= Cuanza =

Cuanza may refer to

- Cuanza, Angola, commune in Bie province, Angola
- Cuanza River, a river in Angola
- Cuanza Norte Province, Angola
- Cuanza Sul Province, Angola
