= Bamby =

Bamby may refer to:

- Bamby, member of the South Korean boy band Plave
- Benjamin "Bamby" Bayeul, member of the Belgian dubstep duo Ganja White Night
- Bamby Cars, British microcar manufacturer
- Bamby Salcedo, Mexican American transgender activist

== See also ==
- Bambi (disambiguation)
