= Luau (disambiguation) =

Lūʻau is a traditional Hawaiian party or feast.

Lūʻau or luau may also refer to:

- Lūʻau (food), a Polynesian dish
- Luau, Cuanza Sul
- Luau, Moxico Leste
- Luau (programming language), a derivative of Lua 5.1 developed by Roblox Corporation
