= Helena Bonguela Abel =

Angolan politician (born 1957)

Member of the National Assembly of Angola
- Parliamentary group: Angolan Women's League (LIMA)

Personal details
- Born: 3 June 1957 (age 69) Cachiungo, Huambo, Angola
- Party: UNITA
- Children: 5, including Adriano Abel Sapinãla

Helena Bonguela Abel (born 3 June 1957) is an Angolan teacher and politician who serves as a member of the National Assembly of Angola as a member of UNITA. She served as vice president and president of the Angolan Women's League (LIMA), the women's branch of UNITA. Her son, Adriano Abel Sapinãla, is also a member of the National Assembly.

== Early life ==
Helena Bonguela Abel was born in Cachiungo, Huambo, Angola, on 3 June 1957. She graduated from college with a bachelor's degree and worked as a primary school teacher from 2009 to 2015. She married José Samuel Chiwale, with whom she had five children before his death. Their son, Adriano Abel Sapinãla, is a member of the National Assembly.

== Career ==
When the Angolan Civil War broke out Abel was living in Menongue, Cuando Cubango Province. Abel joined UNITA as a member of Revolutionary United Youth of Angola. She served as president of the Angolan Women's League (LIMA), the women's branch of UNITA, from 1974 to 1975, its vice president from 2012 to 2017, and as president again until 2024.

Abel was elected to a seat in the National Assembly. Pedro Sebastião led a delegation of Angolan MPs, including Abel, to monitor the 2014 Namibian general election as part of the Southern African Development Community Parliamentary Forum Election Observation Mission. She was considered as a possible candidate for presidency of UNITA in 2019.

Abel has been critical of the poor quality of Angola's maternity wards, the poor living conditions of women in Angola, and human rights abuses in the country.

== Works cited ==
=== News ===
- "Angola Fala Só: Bilhete Identidade Helena Bonguela". Voice of America. 30 June 2016. Archived from the original on 17 June 2025.
- "Angola Fala Só - Helena Bonguela: "O habeas corpus não nos satisfaz"". Voice of America. 1 June 2016. Archived from the original on 17 June 2025.
- "Angola: Helena Bonguela Re-Elected Unita Women Wing President". Angola Press News Agency. 9 August 2020. Archived from the original on 17 June 2025.
- "Angola: List of Elected Members of Parliament to Be Sworn in Thursday". Angola Press News Agency. 27 September 2012. Archived from the original on 17 June 2025.
- "Angolan MPs Monitor Namibian Election". Angola Press News Agency. 20 November 2014. Archived from the original on 17 June 2025.
- "Cesaltina Kulanda é a nova presidente da LIMA". Radio Nova. 7 October 2024. Archived from the original on 17 June 2025.
- Jose, Manuel (9 July 2019). "UNITA, ninguém assume candidatura à liderança ... por agora". Voice of America. Archived from the original on 17 June 2025.

=== Web ===
- "Adriano Abel Sapiñala". UNITA. Archived from the original on 17 June 2025.
- "Helena Bonguela Abel". National Assembly. Archived from the original on 17 June 2025.
- Kanganjo, Adriano (24 September 2024). "Helena Bonguela guarantees that she will continue with her projects with homeless families". UNITA. Archived from the original on 17 June 2025.
