= Olivença =

Olivença may refer to:

- The name in Portuguese of the Spanish town Olivenza in Extremadura, Spain
- Capunda Cavilongo, a town in Angola, called Olivença-a-Nova during the colonial period
- Olivença, Alagoas, a municipality in the state of Alagoas in Brazil
- São Paulo de Olivença, a municipality in the state of Amazonas in Brazil
