= Gambos =

- Municipality & Town
- Location in Angola
- Coordinates: 15°46′59.5″S 14°05′47″E
- Country: Angola
- Province: Huíla

Area
  - Total: 3,137 sq mi (8,124 km^{2})

Population (2014 Census)
  - Total: 79,462
- Time zone: UTC+1 (WAT)

Gambos is a town and municipality in the province of Huíla, Angola. The municipality had a population of 79,462 in 2014.

It is best known (and often confused) for the seat of its municipality, Chiange.

The municipality's semi arid climate and short rainfall levels are the main reason for the draught and famine that seasonly hits the local population, mostly traditional cattle breeders.

== Administrative subdivisions ==
Gambos comprises two subdistricts or communes as follows:

- Chiange, the seat of the municipality
- Chimbemba
