= Catabola =

- Municipality and town
- Location in Angola
- Coordinates: 12°7′S 17°18′E
- Country: Angola
- Province: Bié Province

Area
  - Municipality and town: 1,103 sq mi (2,857 km^{2})

Population (2014 Census)
  - Municipality and town: 126,631
  - Density: 114.8/sq mi (44.32/km^{2})
  - Urban: 28,831
- Time zone: UTC+1 (WAT)
- Climate: Cwb

Catabola is a town and municipality in Bié Province in central Angola. It is located 52.5 kilometres (32.6 mi) by road northeast of Kuito, on the road to Camacupa. The municipality had a population of 126,631 in 2014.

== History ==
Before 1975 the main town was known as "Nova Sintra". On 20 February 1996, the Forças Armadas de Angola (FAA) attacked a UNITA garrison in Lisusu, about 15 kilometres (9.3 mi) from Catabola. It was captured along with towns such as Andulo, Bailundo, Camapuca and Chiguar during the FAA Christmas Offensive of December 1999. Numerous local government officials and sympathizers of the government were killed during the attack.
