= Andulo =

- Municipality and town
- Location in Angola
- Coordinates: 11°29′S 15°50′E
- Country: Angola
- Province: Bié Province

Area
  - Municipality and town: 5,421 km^{2} (2,093 sq mi)

Population (2024 Census)
  - Municipality and town: 285,306
  - Density: 52.63/km^{2} (136.3/sq mi)
  - Urban: 50,000
- Time zone: UTC+1 (WAT)
- Climate: Cwb

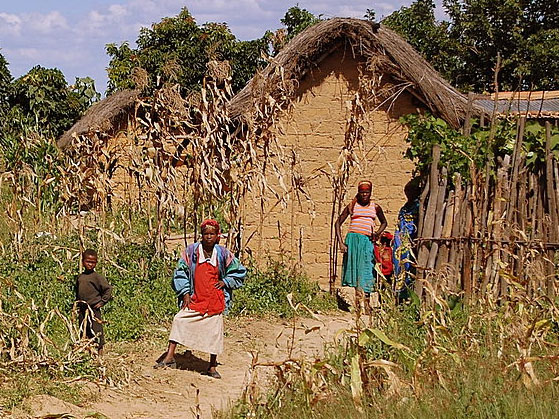
Angolan honey farmers

Andulo is a town and municipality in Bié Province in Angola. The municipality covers an area of 5,421 square kilometres (2,093 sq mi), with a population of 285,306 in 2024. It is bordered to the north by the municipality of Mussende, to the east by the municipalities of Luquembo and Nharea, to the south by the municipalities of Cunhinga, Mungo and Bailundo and west by the municipalities of Cela and Quibala.

== History ==
Andulo was promoted to the category of town on July 3, 1971 and on this date an annual festival is held to celebrate the event.

In September 2008, Islamic extremists rioted in the city, attacking the property of Christians and murdering the young daughter of a deacon.
