= Chissamba =

Angolan mission and hospital site

Coordinates: 12°10′S 17°20′E

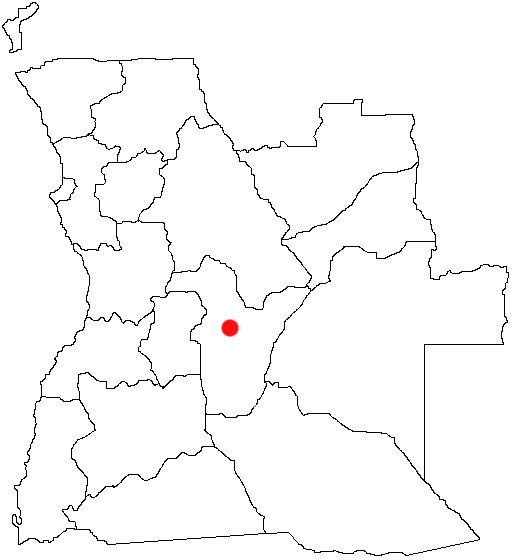
Location of Chissamba in Angola

Chissamba is the site of a Protestant mission near an ombala or capital of a local kingdom located a few kilometers southeast of the town of Catabola, (formerly Nova Sintra), in the province of Bié in Angola. It was established in 1886 as a joint effort of the United Church of Christ Congregational and the United Church of Canada. The first physician at Chissamba was Dr Walter Currie who arrived in 1886. A Bible school was also started at the mission.

From 1927 to 1967, Dr Walter Strangway and his wife Alice ran the hospital at Chissamba, providing medical care and researching local diseases. They were joined by Dr. Elizabeth Bridgeman and Edith Radley. Dr. Elizabeth Bridgeman continued until after the start of the civil war when she and Edith Radley were forced to leave. The hospital and Bible school were destroyed during the civil war but efforts to rebuild were started.

The Missionary Hospital of Chissamba, run by the Evangelical Congregational Church in Angola, partnered with the Angolan government to distribute free medication to the locals. In memory of Strangway's work, the Angolan government named a newly-built hospital near Chissamba after him. The Dr. Walter Strangway Provincial Hospital opened in 2020.
