= Chibia =

- Municipality and town
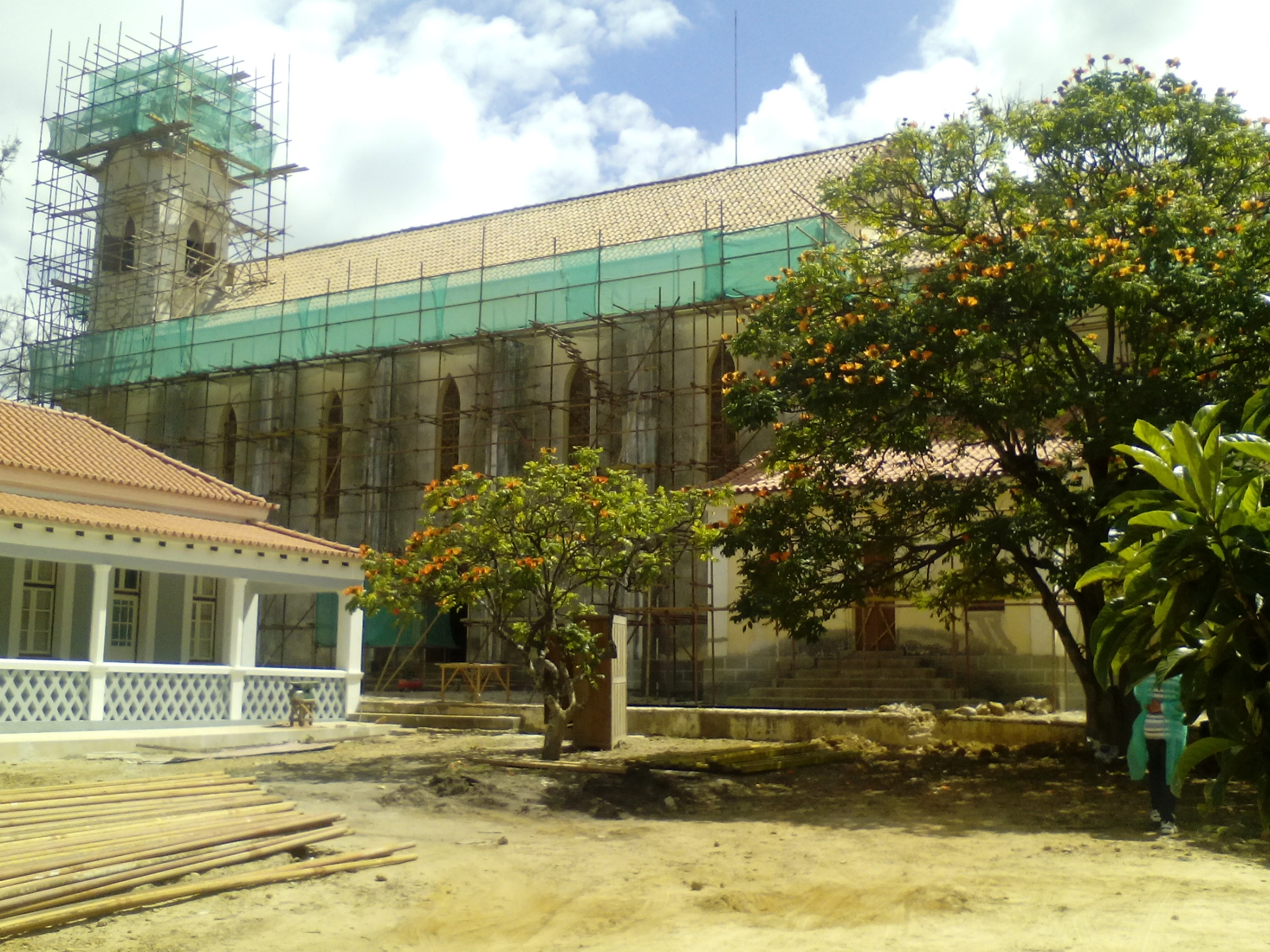

- Location in Angola
- Coordinates: 15°11′S 13°42′E
- Country: Angola
- Province: Huíla

Population (2014 Census)
  - Municipality and town: 190,670
  - Urban: 10,000
- Time zone: UTC+1 (WAT)
- Climate: Cwb
- Website: Chibia

Chibia is a town and municipality in the province of Huíla, Angola. The municipality had a population of 190,670 in 2014.

It is served by a station on the southern network of the national railway network.
