= Chicala =

- commune
- Country: Angola
- Province: Bié Province
- Time zone: UTC+1 (WAT)
- Climate: Aw

Chicala is a city and commune of Angola, located in the province of Bié. It has an electrical substation, with gas isolation technology, which is fundamental to guarantee the reliability of power supply to the city of Luanda.
