= Quilemba =

- Commune
- Location in Angola
- Coordinates: 14°46′47.8″S 13°28′46.4″E
- Country: Angola
- Province: Huíla
- Time zone: UTC+1 (WAT)
- Climate: Aw

Quilemba is a town and commune of Angola, located in the province of Huíla. It is bisected by the province of Namibe.

== See also ==
- Communes of Angola
