= Tchiconco =

Coordinates: 15°00′S 14°21′E

- Commune
- Location in Angola
- Country: Angola
- Province: Huíla
- Time zone: UTC+1 (WAT)
- Climate: Aw

Tchiconco is a town and commune of Angola, located in the province of Huíla.

== See also ==
- Communes of Angola
