= Palanca, Huíla =

Palanca
- Commune
- Location in Angola
- Coordinates: 15°00′00″S 13°26′19″E
- Country: Angola
- Province: Huíla
- Time zone: UTC+1 (WAT)
- Climate: Aw

Palanca is a town and commune of Angola, located in the province of Huíla.

== See also ==
- Communes of Angola
