= Adriano Abel Sapinãla =

Angolan politician (born 1977)

Member of the National Assembly of Angola

Personal details
- Born: September 26, 1977
- Party: UNITA
- Parents: José Samuel Chiwale (father); Helena Bonguela Abel (mother)

Adriano Abel Sapinãla (born 26 September 1977) is an Angolan politician for UNITA and a member of the National Assembly of Angola.

He is the son of the historian José Samuel Chiwale (co-founder of UNITA) and Helena Bonguela Abel, deputy and vice-president of LIMA, the women's organization of the party.
