= Chipeta, Angola =

Chipeta
- commune
- Location in Angola
- Coordinates: 12°16′S 18°8′E
- Country: Angola
- Province: Bié Province
- Time zone: UTC+1 (WAT)
- Climate: Aw

Chipeta is a city and commune of Angola, located in the province of Bié.
