= Cassumbe =

- Commune
- Country: Angola
- Province: Bié Province
- Time zone: UTC+1 (WAT)
- Climate: Aw

Cassumbe is a place and commune of Angola, located in the province of Bié.

== See also ==
- Communes of Angola
