= Libongue =

- Commune
- Location in Angola
- Coordinates: 14.16667°S 15.16667°E
- Country: Angola
- Province: Huíla
- Time zone: UTC+1 (WAT)
- Climate: BSh

Libongue is a town and commune of Angola, located in the province of Huíla.

== Geography ==
=== Climate ===
The climate of Libongue is BSh, a hot semi-arid climate.

== See also ==
- Communes of Angola
