= Chinguar =

- Municipality and town
- Location in Angola
- Coordinates: 12°33′S 16°20′E
- Country: Angola
- Province: Bié Province

Area
  - Municipality and town: 1,112 sq mi (2,879 km^{2})

Population (2014 Census (Urban) 2022 (Municipality))
  - Municipality and town: 167,396
  - Density: 150.6/sq mi (58.14/km^{2})
  - Urban: 26,811
- Time zone: UTC+1 (WAT)
- Climate: Cwb

Chinguar is a town and municipality in Bié Province in Angola. The municipality had a population of 167,396 in 2022.

Chinguar Municipality is divided into three communes, Chinguar, Kangote and Kutato.

== Transport ==
Chinguar lies on the central (Benguela) railway of Angola.

== See also ==
- Railway stations in Angola
