= Matumbo, Angola =

Matumbo c
- Commune
- Location in Angola
- Coordinates: 13°11′S 17°24′E
- Country: Angola
- Province: Bié Province
- Time zone: UTC+1 (WAT)
- Climate: Aw

Matumbo is a city and commune of Angola, located in the province of Bié.

== See also ==
- Communes of Angola
