= Calucinga =

Calussinga
- Commune and town
- Country: Angola
- Province: Bié Province

Area
  - Total: 1,700 sq mi (4,500 km^{2})

Population (2014)
  - Total: 73,872
  - Density: 43/sq mi (16/km^{2})
- Time zone: UTC+1 (WAT)
- Climate: Aw

Calussinga is a town, with a population of 15,000 (2014), and a commune of Angola, located in the province of Bié.

== See also ==
- Communes of Angola
