= Jau, Angola =

Coordinates: 15°14′S 13°31′E

Jau
- Commune
- Location in Angola
- Country: Angola
- Province: Huíla
- Time zone: UTC+1 (WAT)
- Climate: Aw

Jau is a town and commune of Angola, located in the province of Huíla.

== See also ==
- Communes of Angola
