= Chitembo =

- Municipality and town
- Location in Angola
- Coordinates: 13°31′S 16°46′E
- Country: Angola
- Province: Bié Province

Population (2014 Census)
  - Municipality and town: 78,156
  - Urban: 25,000
- Time zone: UTC+1 (WAT)
- Climate: Cwb

Chitembo is a town and municipality in Bié Province in Angola. The municipality had a population of 78,156 in 2014.
