= Matala, Angola =

Matala
- Municipality and town
- Location in Angola
- Coordinates: 14°44′S 15°02′E
- Country: Angola
- Province: Huíla

Population (2014)
  - Municipality and town: 262,763
  - Urban: 78,000
- Time zone: UTC+1 (WAT)
- Climate: Cwa

Matala is a town and a municipality in the province of Huíla, Angola. The municipality had a population of 262,763 in 2014.

Matala is situated along the Kunene River at an elevation of approximately 1300 metres above sea level; the Matala Weir is positioned at this point along the river.

== Transport ==
It lies on the southern line of Angolan Railways.

== See also ==
- Railway stations in Angola
