= Sande, Angola =

Coordinates: 12°02′S 17°05′E

Sande
- Commune
- Location in Angola
- Country: Angola
- Province: Bié Province
- Time zone: UTC+1 (WAT)
- Climate: Aw

Sande is a city and commune of Angola, located in the province of Bié.

== See also ==
- Communes of Angola
