= Huíla (commune) =

Coordinates: 15°04′S 13°33′E

- Commune
- Location in Angola
- Country: Angola
- Province: Huíla
- Time zone: UTC+1 (WAT)
- Climate: Aw

Huíla (commune) is a town and commune of Angola, located in the province of Huíla.

== See also ==
- Communes of Angola
