= Cutato, Bié =

Cutato Kutato
- Commune
- Location in Angola
- Coordinates: 11°27′S 16°20′E
- Country: Angola
- Province: Bié
- Municipality: Chinguar
- Time zone: UTC+1 (WAT)
- Climate: Aw

Cutato or Kutato is a commune of Angola, located in the municipality of Chinguar in the province of Bié.
