= Quipungo =

- Municipality and town
- Location in Angola
- Coordinates: 14°49′S 14°33′E
- Country: Angola
- Province: Huíla

Population (2014 Census)
  - Municipality and town: 158,918
  - Urban: 23,014
- Time zone: UTC+1 (WAT)
- Climate: Cwa

Quipungo is a town and municipality in the province of Huíla, Angola. The municipality had a population of 158,918 in 2014.
