= Cacula =

- Municipality and town
- Location in Angola
- Coordinates: 14°29′53.5″S 14°07′12.7″E
- Country: Angola
- Province: Huíla

Area
  - Total: 1,330 sq mi (3,445 km^{2})

Population (2014 Census)
  - Total: 136,977
- Time zone: UTC+1 (WAT)
- Climate: Cwb

Cacula is a municipality and town in the province of Huíla, Angola. The municipality had a population of 136,977 in 2014.

Cacula was established as a municipality on August 16, 2011, as the latest municipality to be created in the province of Huíla, under the law 32 dated October 11, 2011 and published by the Angolan Bar Association.

== Administrative subdivisions ==
Cacula comprises four subdistricts or communes as follows:

- Cacula (seat), the seat of the municipality
- Chicuaqueia
- Chituto
- Viti-Vivale
