= Chiange =

- Commune and town
- Location in Angola
- Coordinates: 15°44′S 13°54′E
- Country: Angola
- Province: Huíla
- municipality: Gambos

Area
  - Total: 8,150 km^{2} (3,150 sq mi)

Population (2011)
  - Total: 151,375
  - Density: 19/km^{2} (49/sq mi)
- Time zone: UTC+1 (WAT)

Chiange is a town and commune in the municipality of Gambos, province of Huíla, Angola.

It is also the seat of the municipality of Gambos.

Chiange covers 8,150 square kilometres (3,150 mi^{2}) and as of 2011 had a population of 151,375. It is the terminus of a branch of the Moçâmedes Railway, which is the southernmost of the three railway networks in Angola, junctioning at Dongo.
