= Vicungo =

Coordinates: 12°01′S 17°40′E

- commune
- Location in Angola
- Country: Angola
- Province: Huíla
- Time zone: UTC+1 (WAT)
- Climate: Aw

Vicungo is a town and commune of Angola, located in the province of Huíla.

== See also ==
- Communes of Angola
