= Luando =

- Commune
- Location in Angola
- Coordinates: 11°37′S 18°28′E
- Country: Angola
- Province: Bié Province
- Time zone: UTC+1 (WAT)
- Climate: Aw

Luando is a city and commune of Angola located in the province of Bié.

== See also ==
- Communes of Angola
