= Belo Horizonte, Angola =

Belo Horizonte
- municipality
- Location in Angola
- Coordinates: 11°55′S 16°54′E
- Country: Angola
- Province: Bié Province

Area
  - Total: 379.5 sq mi (982.9 km^{2})

Population (2024 census)
  - Total: 42,744
  - Density: 112.6/sq mi (43.49/km^{2})
- Time zone: UTC+1 (WAT)
- Climate: Aw

Belo Horizonte is a city and municipality of Angola, located in the province of Bié. The municipality had a population of 42,744 in 2024.

== See also ==
- Municipalities of Angola
