= Quimavongo =

- Municipality
- Location in Angola
- Coordinates: 7.62°S 13.03°E
- Country: Angola
- Province: Zaire

Population (2009)
  - Total: 15,741
- Time zone: UTC+1 (WAT)

Quimavongo is a town located in Zaire Province, Angola. As of 2009, it has 15,741 inhabitants.
