= Dando, Angola =

Coordinates: 7°34′S 15°29′E

Dando
- commune
- Location in Angola
- Country: Angola
- Province: Bié Province
- Time zone: UTC+1 (WAT)
- Climate: Aw

Dando is a commune of Angola, located in the province of Bié.

== See also ==
- Communes of Angola
