= Chiuca =

- commune
- Country: Angola
- Province: Bié Province
- Time zone: UTC+1 (WAT)
- Climate: Aw

Chiuca is a city and commune of Angola, located in the province of Bié.
