= Project BAMBI =

United States space-based anti-ballistic missile interception program

Project BAMBI (BAllistic Missile Boost Intercept) was a project as part of the United States national missile defense.

At the end of the Second World War, the United States and the Soviet Union began confiscating various German intellectual property for use by their own countries. Among these plans were the plans for intercontinental ballistic missiles (ICBMs) that arrived in New York in 1946. The Pentagon spent the next several decades studying and developing both ICBM and anti-ICBM technology.

In the early 1950s, both the United States and the Soviet Union were capable of waging nuclear war, but not without inviting retaliatory strikes. At the time, nuclear equipped aerial bombs carried by strategic bomber were the only means of deploying a nuclear strike on another country. In order to prevent nuclear attacks of this nature, the United States army developed Project Nike. The missiles designed by Project Nike were intended to intercept the nuclear armed enemy aircraft before they were able to drop their payload.

On May 15 of 1957, the Soviet Union launched the world's first ICBM, the R-7. In response, the United States launched their test model ICBM, Atlas A, in June of the same year. Although both of these ICBMs had less than stellar performances, the technology to wage war around the world using nuclear warheads was now on the horizon.

Two years after the start of the space race, the Soviet Union revolutionized the world of atomic defense with the successful launch of the world's first artificial satellite, Sputnik, on October 4, 1957. The United States quickly realized that by employing this satellite technology, the Soviet Union could potentially deploy nuclear armed ICBMs from orbit, where they would be poised to perform highly accurate nuclear strikes. A United States missile defense program, the Advanced Research Projects Agency (ARPA), was established in early 1958 in an effort to minimize this new threat.

The first project undertaken by the ARPA was Project Defender, which had the primary goal of finding a defense against these ballistic missiles. Almost immediately, the ARPA retrofitted the now defunct Nike missiles into Nike-Zeus missiles that were meant to intercept incoming Soviet ICBMs as they reentered the atmosphere and before they could reach their intended targets. As testing of these Nike-Zeus missiles continued, those working on the Project Defender sought a simpler solution to the issue of these space-faring ICBMs.

By 1960, the idea of space-based interceptors (SBIs) seemed a far more practical solution. These SBIs were envisioned to be capable of boost phase killing and became collectively known as the ballistic missile boost intercept (BAMBI) ABM systems. One of the most notable of the proposed BAMBI systems was the space patrol active defense (SPAD). This was a network of 500 satellites capable of detecting boost plumes with onboard infrared scanners that would then launch several interceptors along a track mapped by an onboard computer. These interceptors were designed to deploy a wire web with a radius ranging from 15 to 50 feet that were adorned with 1 gram pellets at each intersection of the net. These nets would then collide with the detected ICBM during its climb through the atmosphere, shred the fuel tanks of the booster and cause catastrophic damage to the ICBM. BAMBI had a projected annual operational deployment and operation cost of 50 billion dollars. Although sound in theory, the high price tag and a lack of the necessary technology in 1960 prevented this BAMBI system from being developed. Project BAMBI continued to explore other SBI options and workarounds for another 3 years before being cancelled in May 1963 under the Kennedy administration who wanted to avoid deploying a network of nuclear satellites in space after the Cuban Missile Crisis.

In August 1963, the United States, the Soviet Union, and more than 100 other countries signed the Limited Test Ban Treaty which prohibited nuclear testing in space, the atmosphere, or underwater. In December of that same year, the UN adopted a resolution that established a set of general rules for the use of space. It required nations to receive approval from international consultants before they could interfere with the peaceful use of space but it did not ban the development and use of military satellites. Using this loophole, the United States and the Soviet Union were able to retain the bulk of their space programs that had been largely built around satellite deployments. Four years later, in 1967, the Outer Space Treaty was signed by 66 nations and prohibited the passive orbiting of nuclear weapons.

The United States missile defense program (and Project BAMBI) found new life in 1983 with the announcement of the Strategic Defense Initiative (SDI) by President Ronald Reagan during his “Star Wars” speech. The SDI office was limited by the ABM Treaty and the 1974 protocol to a single, central, missile defense site with only 100 interceptors and were prevented from deploying space based missile defense systems. To get around these restrictions, the SDI considered several options like a patrol of crewed space fighters and a resurrection of project BAMBI. This new iteration of BAMBI (dubbed Smart Rocks was proposed by the military advisor to Ronald Reagan, Daniel Graham, and would utilize battle stations low in earth's orbit and air to air missiles. Similar to the SBIs of the BAMBI project, these battle stations would also detect ICBMs by their infrared plume and intercept the ICBMs via collision. Other options of the time were the X-ray lasers of Project Excalibur. Although the Smart Rocks system was initially ignored, after the failed tests of Project Excalibur in 1986, the United States Secretary of Defense, Caspar Weinberger, requested an updated version of Smart Rocks.

The new ballistic missile defense Brilliant Pebbles would eventually become the chief weapons system of the Strategic Defense System (SDS). With the passing of the missile defense act of 1991 and the collapse of the Soviet Union at the end of that same year, it became apparent that SDI would not be able to demonstrate the effectiveness of the Brilliant Pebbles technology because the need for the SDS in general had passed. SDI became the Ballistic Missile Defense Organization (BMDO) in an attempt to salvage their usefulness, but President Bill Clinton cancelled the project in 1993 only for it to be revived by President Bush in 2002 under the new name, the Missile Defense Agency (MDA). The MDA was later reorganized into the Ballistic Missile Defense System (BMDS) and President Bush withdrew the United States from the ABM treaty, but despite this, space-based missile defense programs have yet to be employed by any successive administration.
