= Cachiungo =

Cachiungo Katchiungo
- Municipality and town
- Location in Angola
- Coordinates: 12°34′S 16°14′E
- Country: Angola
- Province: Huambo

Population (2014 Census)
  - Municipality and town: 120,677
  - Urban: 26,974
- Time zone: UTC+1 (WAT)
- Climate: Cwb

Cachiungo or Katchiungo is a town and municipality in the province of Huambo, Angola. The municipality had a population of 120,677 in 2014.

== Notable people ==
- Helena Bonguela Abel (born 1957), teacher and politician
