= Mwila =

Mwila is a name of Zambian origin that may refer to:

- Mwila Phiri (born 1994), Zambian footballer
- Benjamin Mwila (1943–2013), Zambian politician and businessman
- Boyd Mwila (born 1984), Zambian football striker
- Brian Mwila (born 1994), Zambian footballer
- Freddie Mwila (born 1946), Zambian former association football player
- Keith Mwila (1966–1993), Zambian boxer
- Numba Mwila (1972–1993), Zambian footballer
