= Kuvango =

Town in Huíla Province, Angola

Kuvango Cuvango, Kubango
- Municipality
- Location within Angola
- Coordinates: 14°28′S 16°18′E
- Country: Angola
- Province: Huíla

Population (2014 Census)
  - Total: 78,543
- Time zone: UTC+1 (WAT)
- Climate: Cwa

Kuvango (or Cuvango or Kubango) is a town and municipality in the province of Huíla, Angola. The municipality had a population of 78,543 in 2014.

It is served by a station on the southern line of the national railway system.
