= Bambi, Angola =

Town in Huíla, Angola

Coordinates: 14.05°S 15.56667°E

Bambi
- Commune
- Location in Angola
- Country: Angola
- Province: Huíla
- Time zone: UTC+1 (WAT)
- Climate: Aw

Bambi is a town and commune of Angola, located in the province of Huíla.

== See also ==
- Communes of Angola
