= Bamby Cars =

Bamby
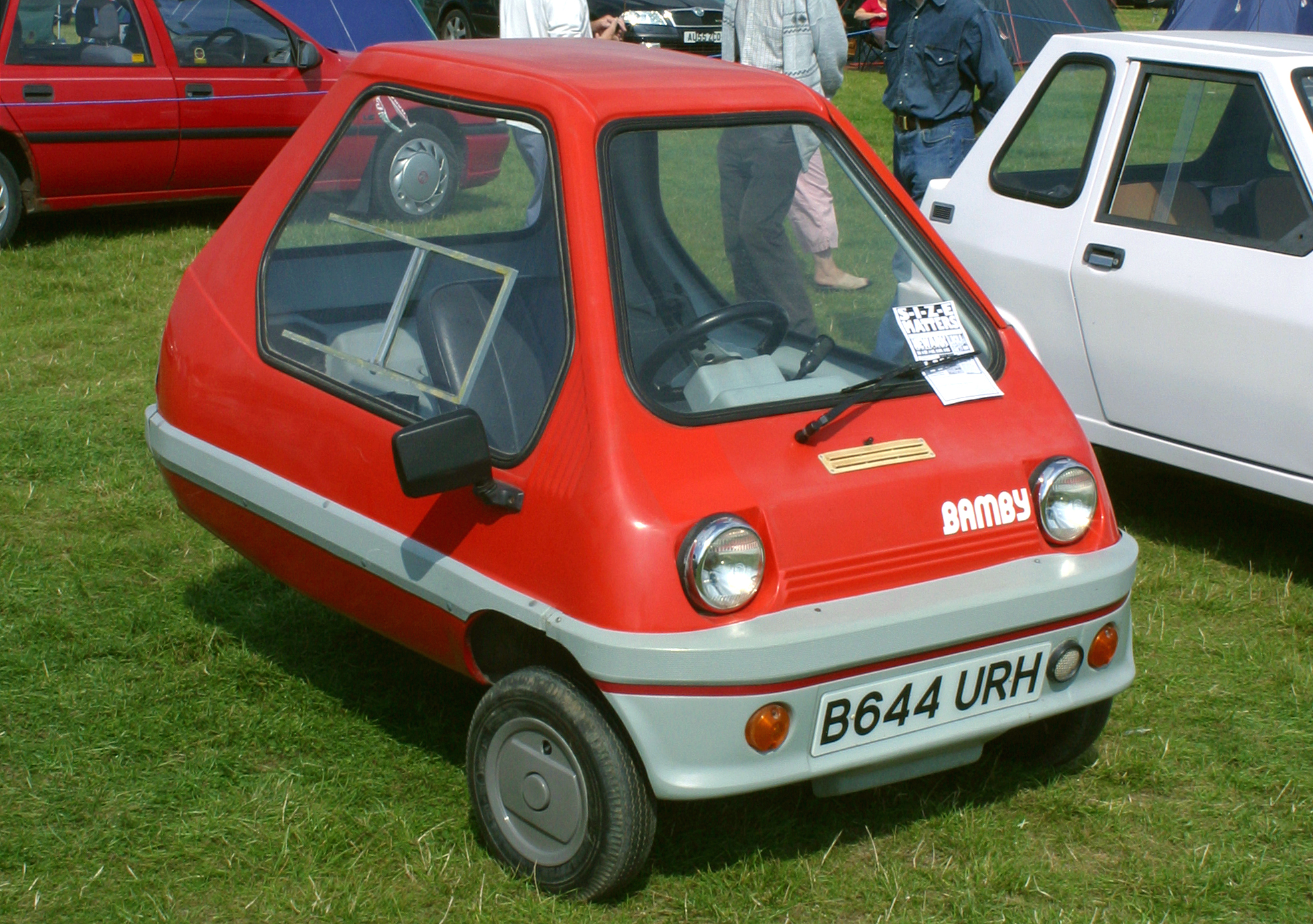

Overview
- Manufacturer: Bamby Cars Ltd
- Production: 1984; 41 years ago
- Designer: Alan Evans

Body and chassis
- Class: Microcar
- Body style: 1-door 1-seater

Bamby Cars were a British brand of microcars produced in small numbers in Hull, England, in the early 1980s. Bambys were designed and built by Alan Evans, who manufactured a one-off replica of the Peel P50 which also served as a prototype for further production.

The Bamby featured a fibreglass body with left side gull-wing door. All Bamby cars were three-wheelers with the single wheel in the rear. Initial models were equipped with hand-started Minarelli 49 cc (3.0 cu in) engines, cable brakes and single headlamps. Improvements introduced included replacing the original engines with the type fitted by Yamaha to their Passola moped, using the main frame components as a subframe for attaching to the body of the car. Brakes were converted to hydraulic discs, but the single headlamp was retained until a further face-lift, from which time two headlights were fitted. At this time the gull-wing entry was deleted and a front-hinged door installed instead. Also introduced was a Suzuki engine, attached via a full chassis, in place of the previously used subframe. Like the Peel P50, there was no reverse gear. The new model was exhibited at the Ideal Home Exhibition of 1984, meeting with overall public approval, but few were made and the final Bamby left the factory within a few months.

Bamby Minimicro are 2/3rd scale replica microcars, there were two models in production, the Schmitt TG & the Schmitt KR. Bamyby Minimicro were built on a welded steel chassis and incorporated the steel framework on which the glassfibre body panels are attached. The canopy lifts as per the real Schmitt to allow access to the cabin which is fully upholstered and carpeted. The boot opens to reveal the engine bay and fuel tank. Power comes from a 49cc two stroke engine with centrifugal clutch and pull start, top speed is in the region of 20 mph (32 km/h).

== See also ==
- Peel Engineering Company
