= Bambi-class tugboat =

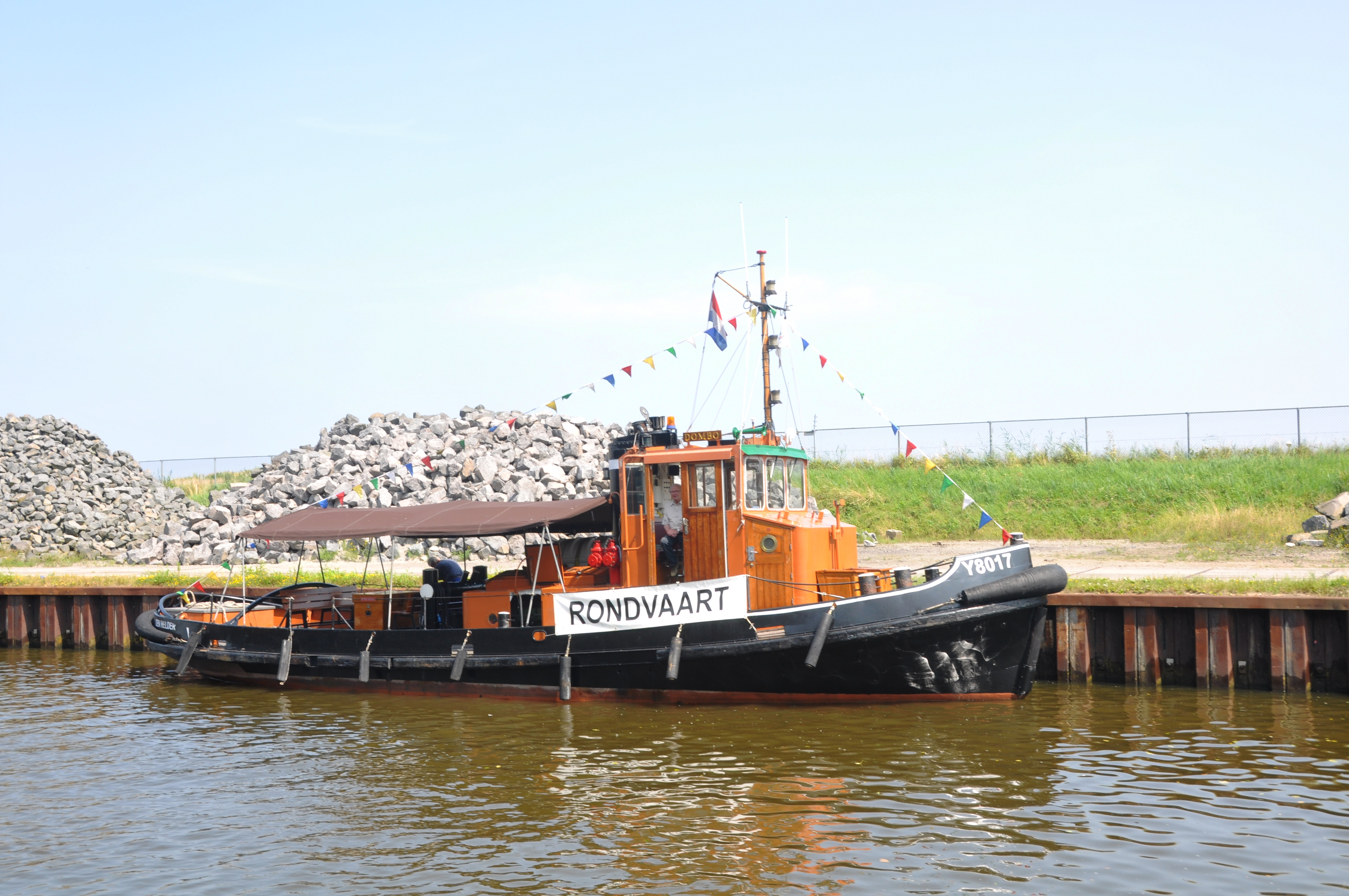
- Dombo

Class overview
- Name: Bambi class
- Builders: Rijkswerf Willemsoord, Den Helder
- Operators: Royal Netherlands Navy
- Completed: 2

General characteristics
- Type: Tugboat
- Displacement: 35 t (34 long tons)
- Length: 16.5 m (54 ft 2 in)
- Beam: 4.6 m (15 ft 1 in)
- Draft: 1.9 metres (6 ft 3 in)
- Installed power: Bambi 240hp; Dombo 200hp
- Propulsion: 1 propeller; Bolnes KL4/L4 diesel engine
- Speed: 8.5 knots (15.7 km/h; 9.8 mph)
- Crew: 4

The Bambi class was a ship class of two tugboats that were built in the Netherlands for the Royal Netherlands Navy.

== Design and construction ==
Both tugboats of the Bambi class were built at the Rijkswerf in Willemsoord. Bambi was launched on 12 May 1953 and Dombo on 25 May 1957. They were 16.5 meters long with a beam of 4.6 m and a draft of 1.9 m. The crew of each tugboat consisted of four people.

While both tugboats shared the same technical specifications, they did differ when it came to appearance.

== Service history ==
In 2004 both tugboats were after many years stationed together again in Willemsoord at the Museumhaven Willemsoord.

In 2021 a new solar tent was installed on Dombo.

On 7 March 2023 Dombo was hoisted out of the water to undergo conservation and maintenance work.

== Ships in class ==
Bambi class construction data
Pennant no.	Name	Builder	Laid down	Launched	Commissioned	Fate
Y 8016	Bambi	Rijkswerf Willemsoord, Den Helder, Netherlands		12 May 1953		Transferred in 1990 to the Dienst Domeinen in Den Helder Currently privately owned by Lars Wintels in Rotterdam
Y 8017	Dombo	Rijkswerf Willemsoord, Den Helder, Netherlands		25 May 1957		Transferred in 2002 to the Nautische Monumenten Stichting in Den Helder
