= BAMBI =

Protein-coding gene in the species Homo sapiens

Identifiers
- Aliases: BAMBI, NMA, BMP and activin membrane-bound inhibitor, BMP and activin membrane bound inhibitor
- External IDs: OMIM: 604444; MGI: 1915260; HomoloGene: 8215; GeneCards: BAMBI; OMA:BAMBI - orthologs

Gene location (Human)
Chr.	Chromosome 10 (human)
Band	10p12.1	Start	28,677,510 bp
Band	10p12.1	End	28,682,932 bp

Gene location (Mouse)
Chr.	Chromosome 18 (mouse)
Band	18|18 A1	Start	3,507,923 bp
Band	18|18 A1	End	3,516,404 bp
RNA expression pattern
Bgee	Human / Mouse (ortholog); Top expressed in: tibia; periodontal fiber; left ovary; cardiac muscle tissue of right atrium; right auricle of heart; cartilage tissue; right ovary; glomerulus; adrenal cortex; left adrenal gland / Top expressed in: tooth; molar; endocardial cushion; Meckel's cartilage; bones of pectoral girdle; clavicle; hair follicle; upper lip; atrioventricular valve; body of femur; More reference expression data
BioGPS	n/a
Gene ontology
Molecular function	type II transforming growth factor beta receptor binding; frizzled binding
Cellular component	cytoplasm; integral component of membrane; plasma membrane; membrane
Biological process	positive regulation of transcription, DNA-templated; positive regulation of protein binding; negative regulation of transforming growth factor beta receptor signaling pathway; cell migration; positive regulation of epithelial to mesenchymal transition; positive regulation of cell population proliferation; regulation of cell shape; positive regulation of canonical Wnt signaling pathway; transforming growth factor beta receptor signaling pathway
Sources:Amigo / QuickGO
Orthologs
Species	Human	Mouse
Entrez	25805	68010
Ensembl	ENSG00000095739	ENSMUSG00000024232
UniProt	Q13145	Q9D0L6
RefSeq (mRNA)	NM_012342	NM_026505
RefSeq (protein)	NP_036474	NP_080781
Location (UCSC)	Chr 10: 28.68 – 28.68 Mb	Chr 18: 3.51 – 3.52 Mb
PubMed search
- Wikidata
View/Edit Human	View/Edit Mouse

BMP and activin membrane-bound inhibitor homolog, also known as BAMBI, is a protein which in humans is encoded by the BAMBI gene.

== Function ==
This gene encodes a transmembrane glycoprotein related to the type I receptors of the transforming growth factor-beta (TGF beta) family. The encoded protein is a pseudoreceptor that lacks an intracellular serine/threonine kinase domain required for signaling. Similar proteins in frog, mouse and zebrafish function as negative regulators of TGF-beta. Therefore, this has led to the suggestion that the encoded protein may function to limit the signaling range of the TGF-beta family during early embryogenesis.
