= Nharea =

- Municipality and town
- Location in Angola
- Coordinates: 11°10′S 17°15′E
- Country: Angola
- Province: Bié Province

Area
  - Municipality and town: 2,692 sq mi (6,972 km^{2})

Population (2014 Census)
  - Municipality and town: 126,339
  - Density: 46.93/sq mi (18.12/km^{2})
  - Urban: 18,000
- Time zone: UTC+1 (WAT)
- Climate: Cwb

Nharea is a town and municipality in Bié Province in Angola. The municipality had a population of 126,339 in 2014.

== History ==
Nharea has been promoted to the category of town on August 15, 1965.
