= Angola Press News Agency =

- Type: News agency
- Owner: Government of Angola
- Founded: July 1975; 51 years ago
- Country: Angola
- Website: www.angop.ao

The Angola Press News Agency or Angola Press Agency (ANGOP; Portuguese: Agência Angola Press) is an official news agency of Angola, based in Luanda. Founded in 1975, it was a former close ally of the now-defunct TASS of the Soviet Union. It is part of the Alliance of Portuguese-speaking News Agencies.

== History ==
ANGOP was founded in April 1975 under the name Agência Nacional Angola Press (ANAP) and later renamed Agência Angola Press when Angola gained independence, by order dated October 30, 1975, promulgated by then president Agostinho Neto and enjoyed autonomy and editorial independence under Presidential Decree No. 9/75 of 15 September 1975.

By Presidential Decree No. 11/78 published on February 3, 1978, ANGOP became a state communication organ. The agency has continued to grow from that date. By the 1980s it had developed into an organization employing over 300 personnel, mostly journalists and editors working on 24-hour shifts. There were offices located throughout the country and five offices abroad, in Portugal, Brazil, United Kingdom, Zimbabwe and Zaire (now the Democratic Republic of Congo.

ANGOP was a member of the Non-aligned News Agency Pool, an organisation that drew its members from over 100 countries.

In 1991, it regained its autonomy and editorial independence under the law n ° 22/91 of 15 June 1991.

== Activities ==
Like any news agency, ANGOP collects and reports national and international news, both in Angola and abroad, providing news to both the domestic and foreign media.

Many international agencies use ANGOP as source of information, among them Thomson Reuters, AP, AFP, EFE, ANSA, Tanjug, IPS, Prensa Latina, Xinhua, Tass, AIM (Mozambique), ST-Press (São Tome e Príncipe), ANG (Guinea-Bissau), VNA (Vietnam), BTA (Bulgaria), ADN (former East Germany), CTK (former Czechoslovakia), PAP (Poland), MTI (Hungary), Agerpres (Romania), ATCC (North Korea), ANN (Nicaragua), APS (Algeria), Azap (former Zaire), ABP (Burundi) and ACI (Congo Brazzaville).

== Awards ==
ANGOP, received in 1990 and 1992, the prize "International Gold Star for Quality", awarded by Business Initiative Directions, and in 1996, the "World Quality Commitment Award" given by JX BAN Image Art, both companies based in Madrid, both vanity awards.
