= Caluquembe =

- Municipality and town
- Location in Angola
- Coordinates: 13°47′S 14°41′E
- Country: Angola
- Province: Huíla

Area
  - Municipality and town: 1,136 sq mi (2,941 km^{2})

Population (2014 Census)
  - Municipality and town: 179,931
  - Density: 158.5/sq mi (61.18/km^{2})
  - Urban: 31,000
- Time zone: UTC+1 (WAT)
- Climate: Cwb

Caluquembe (Kalukembe) is a town and municipality, with a population of 179,931 (2014 census), in the province of Huíla, Angola.

It is also the site of two missionary efforts; one, Roman Catholic and the other, Evangelical Protestant. At the Protestant mission there were for the majority of the past century a Bible school and a hospital run by the Swiss Alliance Missionaire Evangelique.

== Climate ==
Caluquembe has a subtropical highland climate (Köppen: Cwb).

Climate data for Caluquembe
Month	Jan	Feb	Mar	Apr	May	Jun	Jul	Aug	Sep	Oct	Nov	Dec	Year
Daily mean °C (°F)	18.4 (65.1)	18.4 (65.1)	18.8 (65.8)	18.7 (65.7)	16.6 (61.9)	14.7 (58.5)	14.7 (58.5)	16.7 (62.1)	18.9 (66.0)	19.8 (67.6)	19.3 (66.7)	18.6 (65.5)	17.8 (64.0)
Average precipitation mm (inches)	159 (6.3)	156 (6.1)	283 (11.1)	130 (5.1)	7 (0.3)	0 (0)	0 (0)	1 (0.0)	8 (0.3)	106 (4.2)	164 (6.5)	182 (7.2)	1,196 (47.1)
Source: Climate-Data.org
