= Cuemba =

- Municipality and town
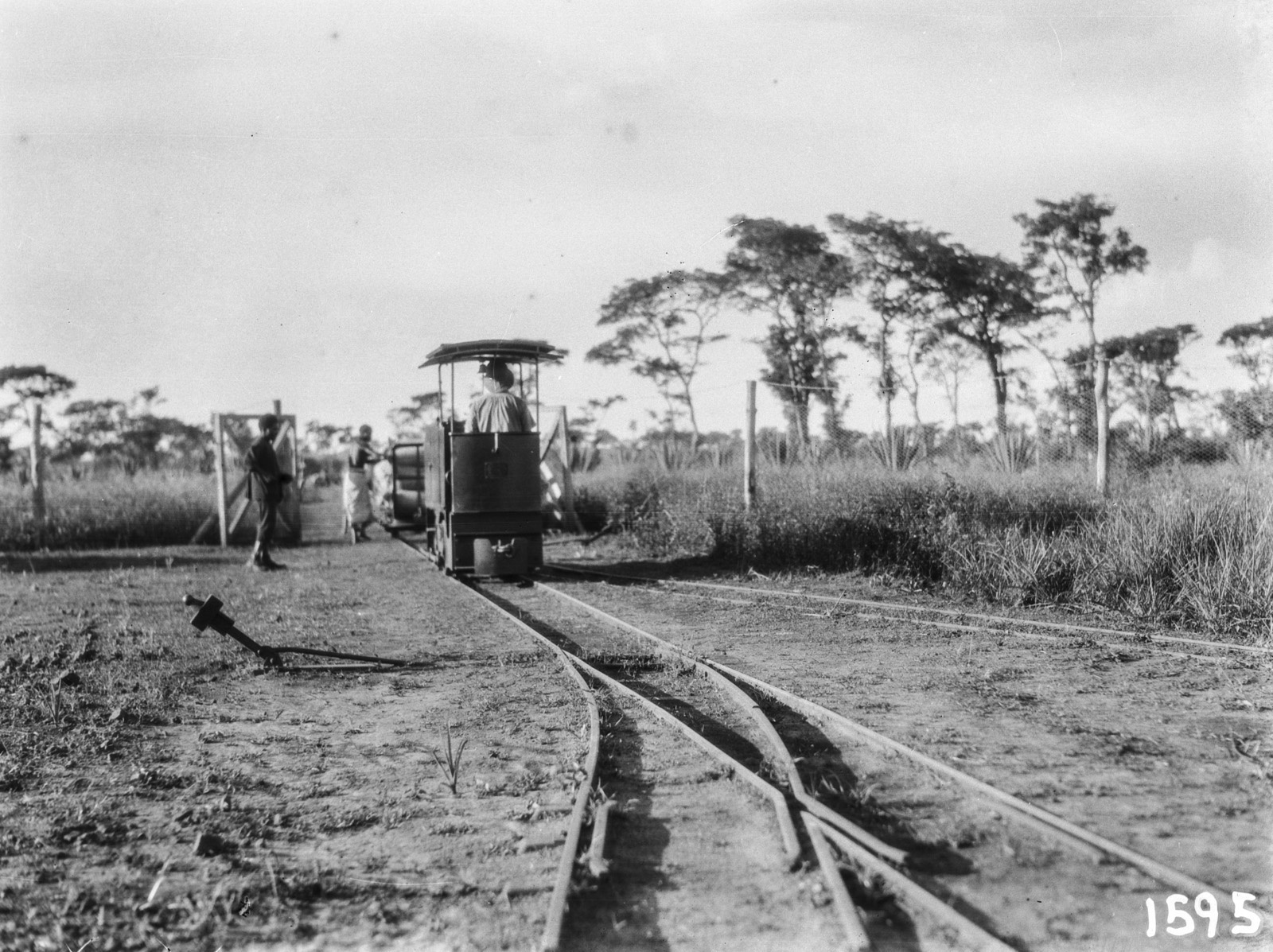
- Narrow gauge railway transporting coffee, 1931/32

- Location in Angola
- Coordinates: 12°9′S 18°5′E
- Country: Angola
- Province: Bié Province

Population (2014 Census)
  - Municipality and town: 56,963
  - Urban: 19,995
- Time zone: UTC+1 (WAT)
- Climate: Cwb

Cuemba is a town and municipality in Bié Province in Angola. The municipality had a population of 56,963 in 2014.

== See also ==
- Railway stations in Angola
