= Rachel Chalkowski =

Israeli midwife and a gemach organizer

- רחל שלקובסקי
- Born: Rachel Bamberger; 1939 (age 85–86); Paris, France
- Other names: Bambi
- Occupation: Head midwife
- Employer: Shaare Zedek Medical Center
- Spouse: Rabbi Moshe Chalkowski
- Website: www.matanbseterbambi.org

Rachel Chalkowski (Hebrew: רחל שלקובסקי; born 1939) is an Israeli midwife and a gemach organizer. Widely known as Bambi, she is a Haredi Jew, and is married to Rabbi Moshe Chalkowski, founding principal of Neve Yerushalayim College for Women. She worked for over 43 years as a midwife at the Shaare Zedek Medical Center in Jerusalem, and set up a charitable foundation to help impoverished Haredi families.

== Biography ==
She was born Rachel Bamberger in Paris in 1939, and had one sister and one brother, the latter being born after their father was taken prisoner by the Nazi-allied government in 1944; her father was deported to his death in the Auschwitz concentration camp. Always determined to become a nurse, she emigrated to Israel at age 15 to live with relatives in Haifa, and attended Bais Yaakov High School before enrolling as a student nurse at Shaare Zedek Medical Center in Jerusalem. After completing her nurse's training, she took a midwifery course, and embarked on her life-long career. She worked at Shaare Zedek Medical Center for 43 years, becoming Head Midwife, and delivering more than 35,000 babies. After retiring from her full-time post at Shaare Zedek, she continued to work there for two nights each week. She asserts that: "Being a midwife is the most beautiful career in the world."

== Matan B'Seter Bambi ==
Noting the poverty of many new mothers from the Haredi sector, who often have large families and must help support them, Chalkowski established a foundation in 1973 called Matan B'Seter Bambi, named after Chalkowski's nickname from her days as a student nurse, when it had been necessary to give nicknames to several students all named Rachel. The foundation has an annual budget of about US$1 million, has 35 branches across North America and Europe, and is coordinated by volunteers in New York. It supports over 400 needy families monthly.

== Documentary ==
Chalkowski and Haredi educator Adina Bar-Shalom are featured in the 2009 documentary film Haredim: The Rabbi's Daughter and the Midwife.

== Personal ==
She is married to Rabbi Moshe Chalkowski, founding principal of Neve Yerushalayim College for Women. The couple have an adopted daughter, Michal, and two grandsons.
