= Cunhinga =

- Municipality and town
- Location in Angola
- Coordinates: 12°14′S 16°47′E
- Country: Angola
- Province: Bié Province

Population (2014 Census)
  - Municipality and town: 73,826
  - Urban: 11,812
- Time zone: UTC+1 (WAT)
- Climate: Cwb

Cunhinga is a town and municipality in Bié Province in Angola. The municipality had a population of 73,826 in 2014.

== History ==
During the colonial period, the town was called Vouga.
