= Luau, Cuanza Sul =

Town in Cuanza Sul Province, Angola

Luau
- Town
- Location within Angola
- Coordinates: 10°37′S 14°58′E
- Country: Angola
- Province: Cuanza Sul
- Elevation: 1,501 m (4,925 ft)
- Time zone: UTC+1:00 (West Africa Time)

Luau is a town in central Cuanza Sul Province of Angola. It lies at an altitude of 1501 metres (4927 feet).
