= Mulondo, Angola =

Mulondo
- Commune
- Location in Angola
- Coordinates: 15°38′53″S 15°12′2″E
- Country: Angola
- Province: Huíla
- Time zone: UTC+1 (WAT)
- Climate: Aw

Mulondo is a town and commune of Angola, located in the province of Huíla.

== See also ==
- Communes of Angola
