= Camacupa =

Camacupa Kamacupa
- Municipality and town
- Location in Angola
- Coordinates: 12°01′32″S 17°28′7″E
- Country: Angola
- Province: Bié Province

Population (2014 Census)
  - Municipality and town: 154,928
  - Urban: 59,000
- Time zone: UTC+1 (WAT)
- Climate: Cwa

Camacupa is a town and municipality in Bié Province in Angola. The municipality had a population of 154,928 in 2014.

It lies on the Central Railway of Angola which heads inland from the port of Benguela.
