= Huíla Province =

Province of Angola

Coordinates: 14°15′S 14°50′E

Huíla
- Province
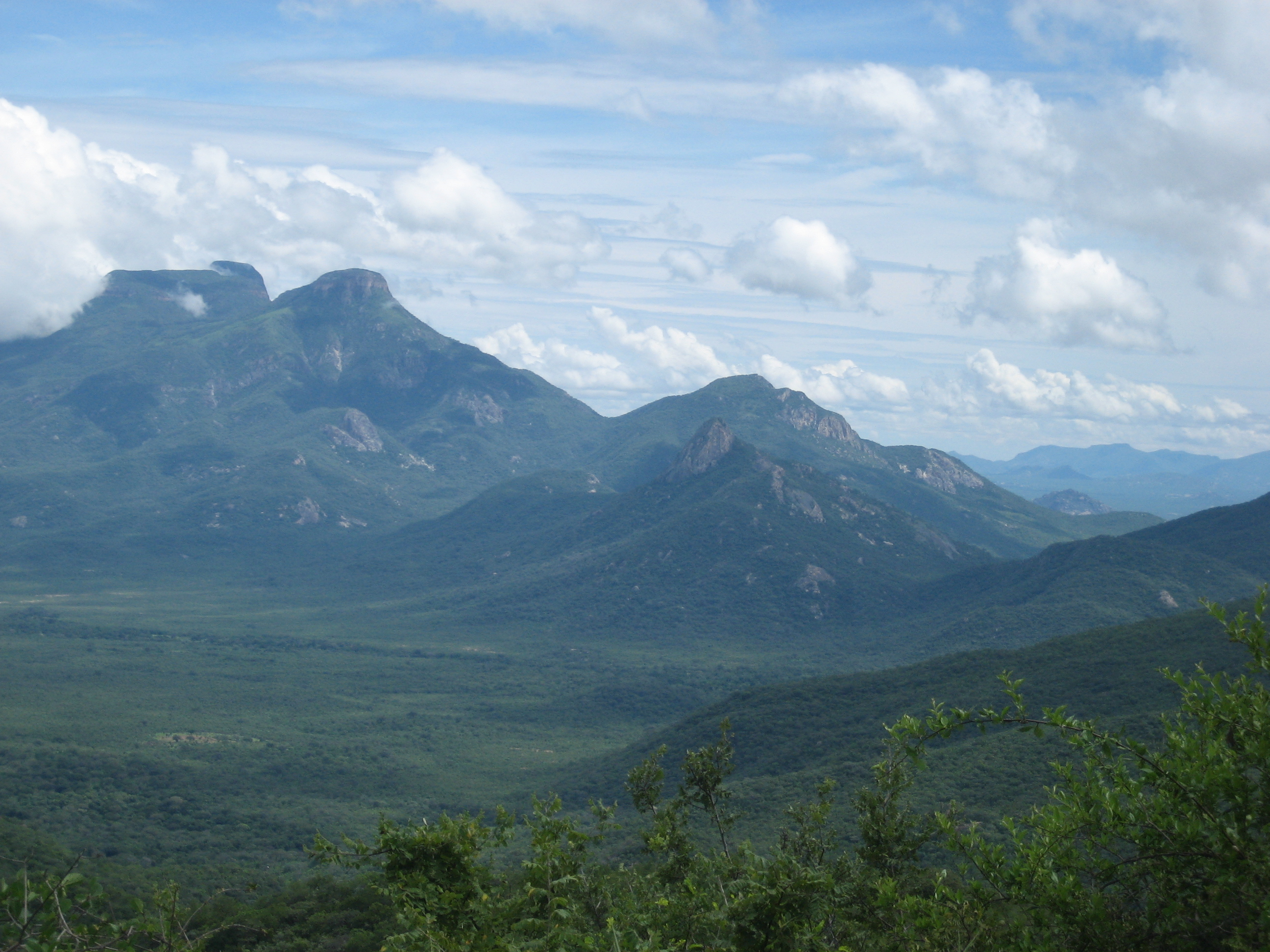
- Serra da Leba, a mountain range in Huíla Province

- Map of Huíla Province in Angola
- Country: Angola
- Capital: Lubango

Government
  - Governor: Nuno Bernabe Mahapi Dala
  - Vice-Governor for the Political, Economic and Social Sector: Maria João Francisco Chipalavela
  - Vice-Governor for Technical Services and Infrastructures: Helio Delize Neto de Almeida

Area
  - Total: 79,023 km^{2} (30,511 sq mi)

Population (2024 census)
  - Total: 3,302,866
  - Density: 41.796/km^{2} (108.25/sq mi)
- Time zone: UTC+1 (WAT)
- Area code: 035
- ISO 3166 code: AO-HUI
- HDI (2018): 0.508 low · 15th
- Website: www.huila.gov.ao

Huíla is a province of Angola. It has an area of 79,023 square kilometres (30,511 mi^{2}) and a population of 3,302,866 (2024 census). Lubango is the capital of the province. Basket-making is a significant industry in the province; many make baskets out of reeds.

== History ==
From the Portuguese Colonial War (1961–1975) to Angola's independence, and the subsequent civil war in Angola (1975-2002) Huíla was directly affected only during relatively short periods of time. Cassinga was abandoned by its European supervisors, and the mine fell into neglect during the ensuing Angolan Civil War. The following year it was occupied by the People's Liberation Army of Namibia (PLAN), military wing of the South West African People's Organization. PLAN subsequently adopted Cassinga as a staging point for insurgent raids on South-West Africa, about 250 kilometres to the south. Their bases soon became a sanctuary for local refugees during the Namibian War of Independence. In 1978, PLAN's presence in Cassinga attracted the attention of the South African Defence Force. Operation Reindeer saw paratroops of the 44 Parachute Regiment supported by bomber and strike aircraft launch an air assault on 4 May. The six-hour assault claimed approximately 600 lives, including four SADF soldiers, sixty Cuban soldiers and over five hundred PLAN combatants and South West African exiles. Cassinga was the site of more fighting during Operation Askari, in December 1983.

The post-colonial development in Angola has seen the establishment of two universities in Lubango (the state Universidade Mandume, named after a leader of the Ovambo in the fight against the occupation by the Portuguese), as well as a campus of the Universidade Privada de Angola. Tourism is emerging, largely involving white entrepreneurs from Namibia, which the provincial government is actively seeking to attract.

== Geography ==
Huíla Province is traversed by the northwesterly line of equal longitude and latitude. The province is bordered on the west by the provinces of Namibe and Benguela, to the north by Bié and Cubango, and to the south by the province of Cunene. The winding road known as Leba Hill, as well as Bicauri National Park are in Huíla Province. Bicauri National Park was established in 1964 and covers an area of 790 km^{2}.

== Municipalities ==
The province of Huíla contains fourteen municipalities (Portuguese: municípios):

Name of Town or City	Land Area	Estimated Population July 2018	Population Density
Caconda	4,715 square kilometres (1,820 mi^{2})	189,450	40.1
Cacula	3,449 square kilometres (1,332 mi^{2})	154,624	44.8
Caluquembe	3,075 square kilometres (1,187 mi^{2})	203,128	66.1
Chibia	5,180 square kilometres (2,000 mi^{2})	215,219	41.5
Chicomba	4,203 square kilometres (1,623 mi^{2})	148,795	35.4
Chipindo	3,898 square kilometres (1,505 mi^{2})	73,056	18.7
Chiange (Gambos)	8,150 square kilometres (3,150 mi^{2})	89,684	11.0
Humpata	1,261 square kilometres (487 mi^{2})	100,634	79.8
Jamba	11,110 square kilometres (4,290 mi^{2})	118,633	10.7
Kuvango	9,680 square kilometres (3,740 mi^{2})	88,670	9.2
Lubango	3,140 square kilometres (1,210 mi^{2})	876,339	279.1
Matala	9,065 square kilometres (3,500 mi^{2})	296,618	32.7
Quilengues	4,464 square kilometres (1,724 mi^{2})	85,040	19.1
Quipungo	7,633 square kilometres (2,947 mi^{2})	179,363	23.5

== Communes ==
The province of Huíla contains the following communes (Portuguese: comunas); sorted by their respective municipalities:

- Caconda Municipality: – Caconda, Cusse, Gungue (Gungui), Uaba (Waba)
- Cacula Municipality: – Cacula, Chicuaqueia (Tchiquaqueia), Chituto (Tchituto), Viti Vivali (Viti Vivale)
- Caluquembe Municipality: – Calépi (Kalépi), Caluquembe (Kalukembe), N'gola
- Chibia Municipality: – Capunda-Cavilongo, Chibia, Jau, Quihita
- Chicomba Municipality: – Chicomba, Cutenda (Kutenda); Libongue, Quê
- Chipindo Municipality: – Bambi, Chipindo; Bunjei
- Gambos Municipality: – Chiange, Chibemba (Chimbemba)
- Humpata Municipality: – Humpata; Bata-Bata, Caholo (Kaholo), Neves, Palanca
- Jamba Municipality: – Cassinga, Dongo, Jamba
- Kuvango Municipality: – Galangue, Kuvango (Cuvango), Vicungo
- Lubango Municipality: – Arimba, Hoque (Degola), Huíla, Lubango, Quilemba
- Matala Municipality: – Capelongo, Matala, Mulondo; Micosse
- Quilengues Municipality: – Dinde, Impulo, Quilengues
- Quipungo Municipality: – Quipungo; Cainda, Hombo (Ombo), Thicongo, Thicungo

== Sports ==
- Estádio de Militar Huíla, a multi-use stadium in Huila

== Demographics ==
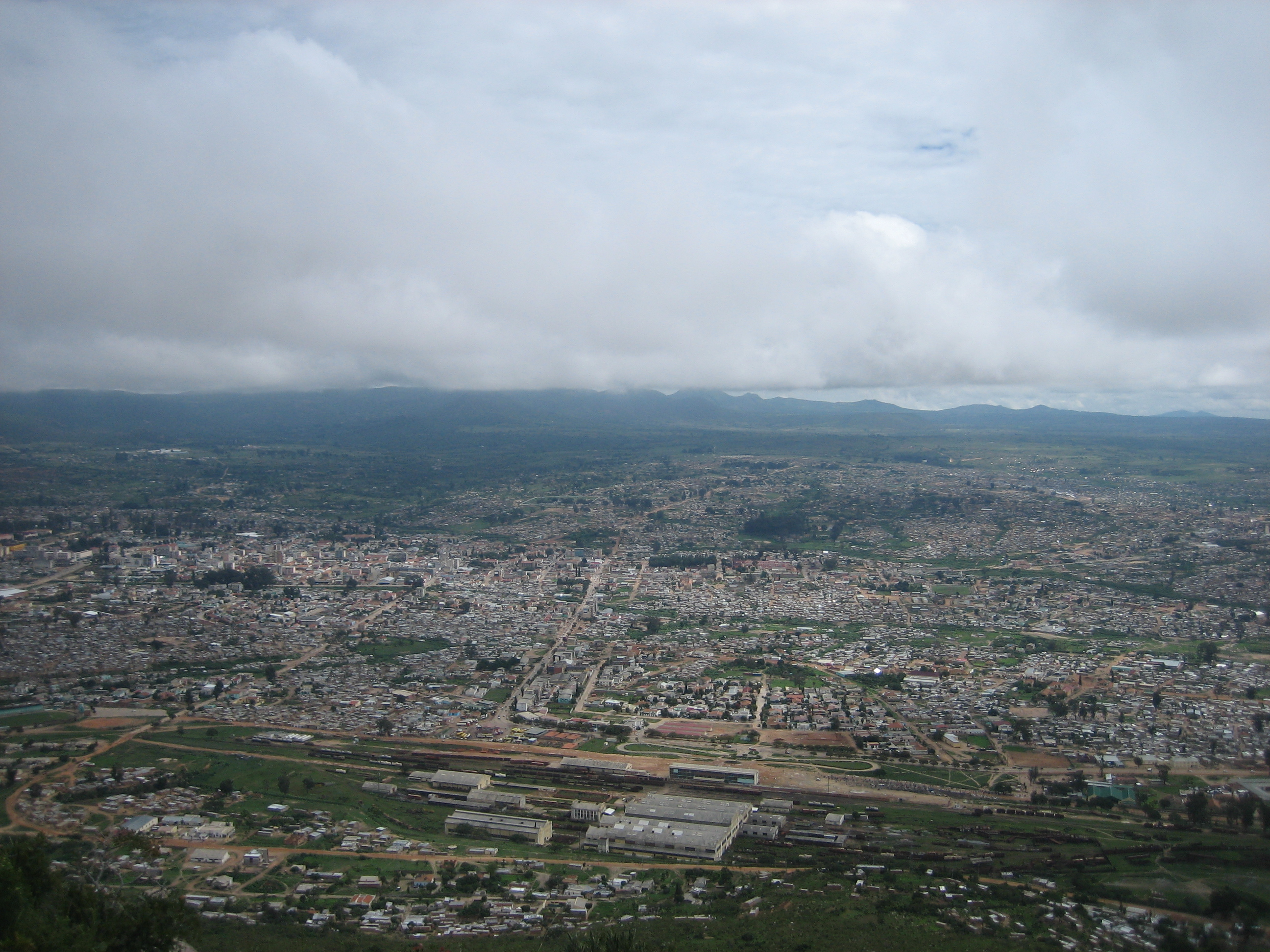
Lubango

As of 2013, the province had a population of 2,609,486 people. The original inhabitants of the area were Khoisan, but only a few residual groups remain today, ousted from pastoral land by other groups. In some areas they represent under 2% of the population. Most pastoral farmers in the province are known Nyaneka-Khumbi, but do not form a whole ethnic group. A significant ethnic group in the province is the Mwila, who originally inhabited the plateau areas.

Favored by the relatively mild climate, there was a relatively strong colonization by Portuguese immigrants who sometimes mixed with the local population. This led to expansion and diversification of agriculture at the same time, but also to a growth of cities and towns. However, the influx of IDPs in the thousands during the war severely affected the province. During the war, a considerable number of Ovimbundu fled to the highlands of the province of Huíla. In some areas they now represent some 37% of the population, with the largest concentration in the central highlands. There is now also a much smaller number of Bakongo who had been assimilated from the Congo, and some settled in the province upon their return. The Heroro represent about 0.5% of the population.

== List of governors of Huila ==
Name	Years in office
Emílio Braz	1975–1976
Belarmino Sabugosa Van-Dúnem	1976–1978
Nazário Vital	1978–1979
Maj. Miguel João Luís Ivady	1979–1981
Mariano da Costa Garcia Puku	1981–1983
Rafael Sapilinha Sambalanga	1983–1986
Lopo Fortunato Ferreira do Nascimento	1986–1990
Dumilde das Chagas Simões Rangel	1990–1995
Kundi Paihama	1995–1999
Francisco José Ramos da Cruz	1999–2008
Isaac Francisco Maria dos Anjos	2008–2012
João Marcelino Tyipinge	2012–2018
Luís da Fonseca Nunes	2018–2021
Nuno Bernabé Mahapi Dala	2021–

Up to 1991, the official name was Provincial Commissioner
