= Besueri Kiwanuka Lusse Mulondo =

Ugandan politician

Besueri Kiwanuka Lusse Mulondo (12 March 1926 – 4 April 2016) was a Ugandan politician and a Senior Presidential Adviser on Land Matters.
