= Caconda =

- Municipality and town
- Location in Angola
- Coordinates: 13°46′S 15°5′E
- Country: Angola
- Province: Huíla

Area
  - Total: 1,785 sq mi (4,622 km^{2})

Population (2024 Census)
  - Total: 226,236
  - Density: 126.8/sq mi (48.95/km^{2})
- Time zone: UTC+1 (WAT)
- Climate: Cwb

Caconda is a town and a municipality in the province of Huíla, Angola. The municipality had a population of 226,236 in 2024.

The Concelho (municipality) was officially founded on 1857. It has a population of 226,236 (2014 census). In the 19th century, Caconda was the most advanced point in the colonial territory of Portugal in Africa.

There is also another populated place in Angola called Caconda, in the province of Huambo, and a river, in the province of Uige.

Caconda has a place in the history of zoology, because it was in this region that the great Portuguese naturalist and explorer José Alberto de Oliveira Anchieta (1833–1897) carried out the greater part of his work. He died in 1897 in Caconda, while returning from an expedition.

The Caconda region was severely affected by the Angolan Civil War. It is an extremely poor area, with a more than 20% malnutrition rate and many families living on subsistence farming. Many people were displaced during the civil war. The United Nations relief program and the World Food Programme have been essential in addressing the humanitarian catastrophe.

== Geography ==
It is located the Plano Alto region, approximately 280 km North of Lubango, the provincial capital city, and approximately 700 km South from Luanda, the country's capital city.

=== Climate ===
Caconda has a subtropical highland climate (Köppen: Cwb).

Climate data for Caconda
Month	Jan	Feb	Mar	Apr	May	Jun	Jul	Aug	Sep	Oct	Nov	Dec	Year
Daily mean °C (°F)	18.9 (66.0)	19.0 (66.2)	19.3 (66.7)	19.0 (66.2)	16.8 (62.2)	14.9 (58.8)	15.0 (59.0)	17.2 (63.0)	19.7 (67.5)	20.5 (68.9)	19.7 (67.5)	19.0 (66.2)	18.3 (64.9)
Average precipitation mm (inches)	172 (6.8)	160 (6.3)	266 (10.5)	123 (4.8)	8 (0.3)	0 (0)	0 (0)	0 (0)	7 (0.3)	93 (3.7)	160 (6.3)	193 (7.6)	1,182 (46.6)
Source: Climate-Data-org
