= Chicomba =

- Municipality and town
- Location in Angola
- Coordinates: 14°8′S 14°55′E
- Country: Angola
- Province: Huíla

Population (2014 Census)
  - Municipality and town: 168,114
  - Urban: 9,428
- Time zone: UTC+1 (WAT)
- Climate: Cwa

Chicomba is a town and municipality in the province of Huíla, Angola. The municipality had a population of 131,807 in 2014.And a population of 168,114 in 2022.
