= Bié Province =

Province of Angola

Coordinates: 12°31′S 17°34′E

Bié
- Province
- Bie, province of Angola
- Country: Angola
- Capital: Kuito

Government
  - Governor: Celeste Elavoco David Adolfo
  - Vice-Governor for the Political, Economic and Social Sector: Alcida Celeste de Jesus Camateli
  - Vice-Governor for Technical Services and Infrastructures: José Fernando Tchatuvela

Area
  - Total: 70,314 km^{2} (27,148 sq mi)

Population (2024 census)
  - Total: 2,264,874
  - Density: 32.211/km^{2} (83.426/sq mi)
- ISO 3166 code: AO-BIE
- HDI (2018): 0.491 low · 17th
- Website: www.bie.gov.ao

Bié is a province of Angola located on the Bié Plateau in central part of country. Its capital is Kuito, which was called Silva Porto until independence from Portugal in 1975. The province has an area of 70,314 square kilometres (27,148 mi^{2}) and a population of 1,455,255 in 2014. The current governor of Bié is Celeste Elavoco David Adolfo.

== Geography ==
Bié has boundaries with the province of Malanje, to the northeast with the province of Lunda Sul, to Moxico, to the south with Cuando Cubango and to the west with the provinces of Huila, Huambo and Cuanza Sul.

== Climate ==
The climate of Bié is cool and abundant rainfall makes it possible to farm maize, sugar cane, rice, coffee and peanuts. Its ground is among the most fertile in Angola.

== History ==
The province was once an important commercial link between the Portuguese traders at the port of Benguela on the Atlantic Ocean and the Ovimbundu in the interior. The capital and other cities in the province remain important commercial centers in Angola.

=== Origins of Jonas Savimbi ===
Bié province is perhaps best known as the place where the family of Angolan political leader Jonas Savimbi came from. Savimbi, although born in Moxico Province near Bié, was ethnically Bieno, a subgroup of the Ovimbundu. He led the UNITA movement first in the anti-colonial war against the Portuguese, and then in the Civil War against the ruling MPLA before he was killed in combat in 2002. Savimbi gained global notoriety as a United States ally during the Cold War.

=== Angolan Civil War ===
Bié is one of the regions that was heavily affected by the Angolan Civil War. During the civil war, agriculture came to a halt in several areas, and part of the rural population fled to the cities. The province capital Kuito was in part destroyed by bombing, as were roads and other infrastructures. Since 2002, reconstruction efforts have been important, but as of early 2011 much remained to be done.

== Municipalities ==
The province of Bié contains nine municipalities (Portuguese: municípios):

- Andulo
- Camacupa
- Catabola
- Chinguar
- Chitembo
- Cuemba
- Cuíto (Kuito)
- Cunhinga
- N'Harea (Nharea)

== Communes ==
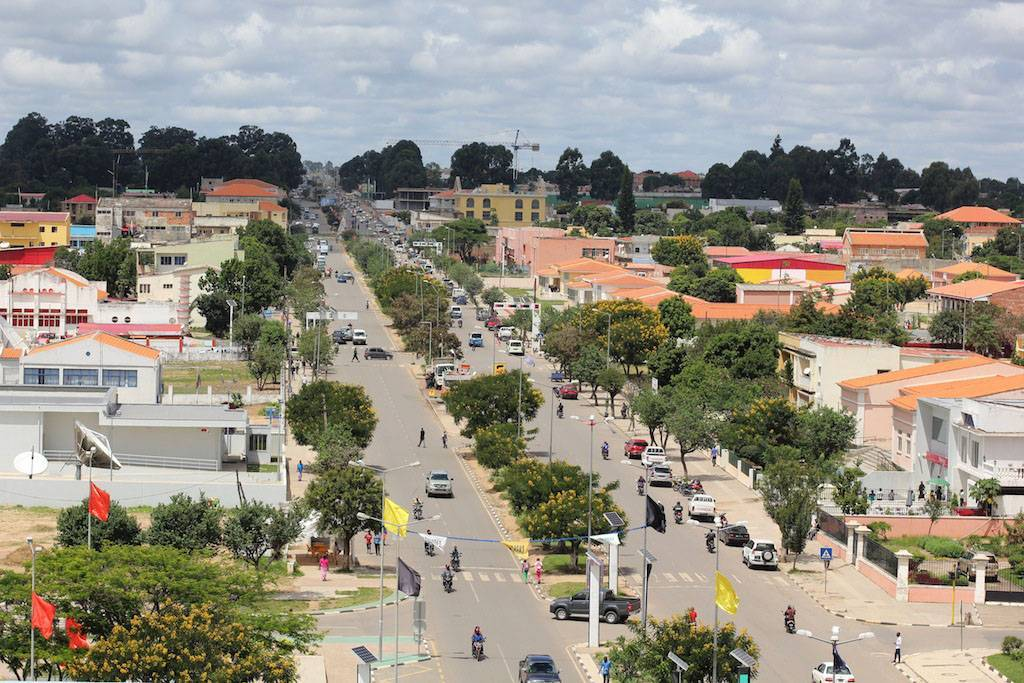
Cuíto in Bié Province

The province of Bié contains the following communes (Portuguese: comunas); sorted by their respective municipalities:

- Andulo Municipality – Andulo, Calucinga, Cassumbe, Chivaúlo
- Camacupa Municipality – Camacupa, Cuanza, Ringoma, Santo António da Muinha, Umpulo
- Catabola Municipality – Caiuera (Caivera), Catabola Chipeta, Chiuca, Sande
- Chinguar Municipality – Cangote (Kangote), Chinguar, Cutato (Kutato)
- Chitembo Municipality – Cachingues, Chitembo, Malengue, Mumbué, Mutumbo (Matumbo), Soma Cuanza
- Cuemba Municipality – Cuemba, Luando, Munhango, Sachinemuna
- Kuito Municipality – Cambândua, Chicala, Cuíto (Kuito), Cunje (Kunje), Trumba
- Cunhinga Municipality – Belo Horizonte, Cunhinga
- N'Harea Municipality – Calei (Caiei), Dando, Gamba, Lúbia, N'Harea (Nharea)

== List of governors of Bié ==
Name	Years in office
Amílcar Saraiva de Figueiredo	1976–1977
Fernando Faustino Muteka	1977–1979
João Baptista Jamba aka Jamba Ya Mina	1979–1982
João Marques Monocapui Bassovava	1982–1986
Marcolino José Carlos Moco	1986–1987
Luís Paulino dos Santos	1987–2002
José Amaro Tati	2002–2008
Cândida Celeste da Silva	2008–2009
Álvaro de Boavida Neto	2009–2017
Pereira Alfredo	2018–

Up to 1991, the official name was Provincial Commissioner.
