= Communes of Angola =

List of third-level administrative subdivisions in Angola

The Communes of Angola (Portuguese: comunas) are administrative units in Angola after municipalities. The 163 municipalities of Angola are divided into communes.

The number of communes has changed over time. In 2014, there were 559 communes. As of 2024, governmental restructuring had converted some communes to municipalities, reducing the number to 378 communes (while increasing the number of municipalities from 162 to 326).

== Bengo Province ==
- Ambriz
- Kakalo-Kahango
- Ícolo e Bengo
- Cassoneca
- Bela Vista
- Tabi
- Zala
- Kikabo
- Barra do Dande
- Muxiluando
- Kixico
- Kanacassala
- Gombe
- Kicunzo
- Kage
- Mabubas
- Caxito
- Ucua
- Piri
- Kibaxe
- São José das Matas
- Kiaje *Paredes
- Bula-Atumba
- Pango-luquem
- Kabiri
- Bom Jesus
- Catete
- Calomboloca
- Kazua
- Muxima
- Dembo Chio
- Mumbondo
- Kixinje

== Benguela Province ==
- Babaera
- Balombo
- Benfica
- Benguela
- Biópio
- Bocoio
- Candumbo
- Catumbela
- Chigongo
- Chikuma
- Chila
- Chindumbo
- Chongorói
- Compão
- Cote
- Cubal
- Cubal do Lumbo
- Dombe Grande
- Lobito Canata
- Catumbela
- Egito
- Monte Belo
- Passe
- Caimbambo
- Catengue
- Baia Farta
- Cupupa
- Imbala
- Quendo
- Chiongoroi
- Capupa
- Bolongueira
- Ganda
- Babaera
- Kasseque
- Chicurnu
- Ebanga

== Bié Province ==
- Munhango
- Caivera
- Sachinemuna
- Andulo
- Belo Horizonte
- Cambândua
- Chicala
- Chinguar
- Chipeta
- Chitembo
- Chiuca
- Chivaúlo
- Cutato
- Dando
- Gamba
- Kachingues
- Kaiei
- Kalucinga
- Kamakupa
- Kangote
- Kassumbe
- Katabola
- Kuemba
- Kuito
- Kunhinga
- Kunje
- Kwanza
- Luando
- Lúbia
- Malengue
- Mumbué
- Mutumbo
- Nharea
- Ringoma
- Sande
- Soma Kwanza
- Santo António da Muinha
- Trumba
- Umpulo

== Cabinda Province ==
- Miconje
- Luali
- Cabinda
- Malembo
- Tanto-Zinze
- Landana
- Massabi
- Inhuca
- Necuto
- Belize

== Cuando Cubango Province ==
- Baixo Longa
- Bondo
- Chinguanja
- Cuangar
- Cutato
- Dirico
- Kaiundo
- Kalai
- Kuchi
- Kueio
- Kuito Kuanavale
- Kutuile
- Longa
- Luengue
- Luiana
- Maue

== Cuanza Norte Province ==
- Aldeia Nova
- Banga
- Danje - ia - Menha
- Dondo
- Golungo Alto
- Kaenda
- Kakulo
- Kamabatela
- Kambondo
- Kanhoca
- Kiangombe
- Kiculungo
- Kilombo dos Dembos
- Kissola
- Luinga
- Lucala
- Massangano
- Maúa
- Ndalatando
- Quiage
- Quibaxe
- São Pedro da Kilemba
- Samba Cajú
- Samba Lukala
- Tango
- Zenza do Itombe
- Bindo
- Bolongongo
- Cariamba
- Terreiro
- Quiquemba
- Cacongo
- Cerca
- Camome
- Cavunga
- Kiluanje

== Cuanza Sul Province ==
- Assango
- Botera
- Dumbi
- Ebo
- Gabela
- Gangula
- Kabuta
- Kalulo
- Kapolo
- Kariango
- Kassanje
- Kassongue
- Kibala
- Kienha
- Kikombo
- Kilenda
- Kissanga Kungo
- Kissongo
- Konda
- Kungo e Sanga
- Kunjo
- Munenga
- Mussende
- Ndala Kachibo
- Pambangala
- Quissanga
- Sanga
- São Lucas
- Ucu–Seles
- Waco Cungo
- Sumbe
- Porto Amboim
- Quipaze
- Atôme
- Quirimbo
- Ambovia

== Cunene Province ==
- Bangula
- Cacite
- Castilhos
- Chitado
- Evale
- Humbe
- Kafima
- Kahama, Angola
- Kalonga
- Kuvati
- Kuvelai
- Melunga-Chiede
- Môngua
- Mukope
- Mupa
- Namakunde
- Naulila
- Ombala yo Mungu
- Ondjiva
- Oximolo
- Shiede
- Xangongo
- Nehone Cafima
- Evale
- Simporo
- yonde
- Xagongo
- Oncócua
- Otthinjau

== Huambo Province ==
- Alto–Uama
- Bailundo
- Bimbe
- Chiaca
- Chinhama
- Chinjenje
- Chipipa
- Chiumbo
- Huambo
- Kaála
- Kachiungo
- Kakoma
- Kalenga
- Kalima
- Kambuengo
- Katabola
- Katata
- Kuima
- Lépi
- Londuimbali
- Longonjo
- Lunge
- Mbave
- Mungo
- Sambo
- Tchipeio
- Thicala Yhilohanga
- Ukuma
- Ussoke
- Hengue-Caculo
- Ecuma
- Tchiahana
- Chilata
- Tchiumbo
- Hungulo
- Mundundo

== Huíla Province ==
- Cacula
- Cacula-Sede
- Capunda-Cavilongo
- Chiange-Sede
- Chibemba
- Chibia-sede
- Chicomba
- Chipindo
- Dongo
- Galangue
- Gungue
- Humpata-Sede
- Jamba
- Jau
- Kakonda
- Kalépi
- Kalukembe
- Kassinga
- Kilengue Kusse
- Kutenda
- Kuvango
- Lubango
- Matala
- Ngola
- Quihita
- Quipungo-Sede
- Tchipungo
- Uaba
- Santo Arina
- Huila
- Quilengues
- Dinde
- Imulo
- Degola
- Cusse
- Bambi
- Vincungo
- Tchibembe
- Capelango
- Mulondo

== Luanda Province ==
- Bairro Operário
- Barra do Cuanza
- Benfica e Mussulo
- Cacuaco
- Camama
- Cassequel
- Cazenga
- Corimba
- Da Ilha
- Futungo de Belas
- Golfe (Luanda)
- Havemos de Voltar
- Hoji Ya Henda
- Kinanga
- Margal
- Neves Bendinha
- Ngola Kiluange
- Prenda
- Ramiro (Luanda)
- Rangel (Luanda)
- Rocha Pinto
- Sambizanga
- Tala Hady
- Terra Nova (Luanda)
- Vila Estoril
- Cuca (Luanda)
- Ilha do Cabo
- Patrice Lumuba
- Maculusso
- Kilamba Kiaxi
- Palanca (Luanda)
- Malanga (Luanda)
- Samba, Angola
- Funda
- Quicolo
- Viana, Angola
- Calumbo

== Lunda Norte Province ==
- Iongo
- Kachimo
- Kamaxilo
- Kambulo
- Kamissombo
- Kanzar
- Kapenda Kamulemba
- Kaungula
- Kuango
- Lóvua
- Luachimo
- Luia
- Luremo
- Xa–Cassau
- Xá-Muteba
- Xinge
- Lucapa
- Sombo
- Capaia
- Thitato
- Cuilo
- Caluango
- Iubalo
- Muvulege
- Luangue
- Cassengue
- Quitapa.

== Lunda Sul Province ==
- Alto-Chikapa
- Chiluage
- Dala, Angola
- Kakolo
- Kassai-Sul
- Kukumbi
- Mona-Kimbundo
- Mukonda
- Murieje
- Saurimo
- Sombo
- Xassengue
- Cazeje
- Luma Cassai

== Malanje Province ==
- Cacuso
- Cinguengue
- Kacuso
- Pungo-Andongo
- Cuale
- Quinge
- Cambundy
- Catembo
- Dumba (Malanje)
- Cabango
- Tala Mungongo
- Bembo (Malanje)
- Caombo
- Micanda
- Luquembo
- Capunda
- Dombo
- Marimba, Angola
- Quimbango
- Quihuhu
- Muquize
- Catala
- Quirima
- Saltar
- Cazongo
- Cainda
- Calunda
- Lumbala N'guimbo
- Candundo
- Macondo
- Lumbala-Ngimbo
- Chiume
- Lumai
- Lutembo
- Mussuma
- Ninda
- Sessa
- Kalamagia
- Kalandula
- Kambaxe
- Kambo, Angola
- Kambondo
- Kangandala
- Kangando
- Karibo
- Kateco-Kangola
- Kaxinga
- Kela
- Kimambamba
- Kissele
- Kiuaba-Nzoji
- Kizenga
- Kota
- Kunda-iá-Baze
- Lombe
- Malanje
- Massango
- Mikixi
- Milando
- Moma
- Mufuma
- Mukari
- Ngola-Luije
- Sokeko
- Tembo-Aluma
- Xandele

== Moxico Province ==
- Alto Zambeze
- Chiume
- Kaianda
- Kalunda
- Kamanongue
- Kangamba
- Kangumbe
- Kavungo
- Lago-Dilolo
- Léua
- Liangongo
- Lovua
- Luakano
- Lukusse
- Lumbala-Kakengue
- Lumbala N'guimbo
- Lumeje Kameia
- Lutembo
- Lutuai ou Muangai,
- Macondo
- Mussuma
- Ninda
- Tempué
- Sessa
- Cassamba
- Muié

== Namibe Province ==
- Bentiaba
- Bibala-Sede
- Cainde
- Caitou
- Camacuio-Sede
- Chingo (Namibe)
- Kapagombe
- Lola (Namibe)
- Mamué
- Mucaba
- Muinho
- Savo-Mar
- Saint Martin of the Tigers
- Tômbua
- Torre do Tambo
- Virei-Sede
- Yona (Namibe)
- Namibe
- Lucira

== Uíge Province ==
- Aldeia Viçosa
- Alto Zaza
- Bembe
- Beu
- Buengas
- Bungo
- Cambembe
- Cuilo Pombo
- Dimuca
- Kinvuenga
- Lucanga
- Mabaia
- Macuba
- Mbanza Nnosso
- Quinzala
- Sacandica
- Uamba
- Vista Alegre (Uíge)
- Uíge
- Negage
- Dimuca
- Quisseque
- Puri, Angola
- Cangola
- Mengo
- Caiongo
- Sanza Pompo
- Milunga
- Macocola
- Massau
- Macolo
- Quimbele
- Cuango
- Icoca
- Nova Esperança (Uíge)
- Qitexe
- Cuilo-Camboso
- Cambamba
- Songo
- Nova Caipenba
- Quipedro
- Camatambo
- Lembua
- Petecussso
- Maquela do Zombo
- Quibocolo
- Cuilo-Futa

== Zaire Province ==
- Kanda
- Kelo
- Kiende
- Kindeji
- Kinzau
- Kiximba
- Kuimba
- Loje-Kibala
- Luvu
- Mangue Grande
- Mbanza Kongo
- Mbuela
- Mussera
- Nkalambata
- Nóqui
- Nzeto
- Pedra de Feitiço
- Soyo
- Sumba
- Caluca
- Nadinba
- Buela
- Luvaca
- Lufico
- Mpala Lulendo
- Loge
- Tomboco
- Quingombe
- Caluca
- Nadimba
- Buela

== See also ==
- Provinces of Angola
- Municipalities of Angola
