= Moxico (municipality) =

- Municipality
- Location in Angola
- Coordinates: 11°47′28″S 19°55′37″E
- Country: Angola
- Province: Moxico

Area
  - Total: 3,899 km^{2} (1,505 sq mi)

Population
  - Total: 177,000
  - Density: 45.4/km^{2} (118/sq mi)
- Time zone: UTC+1 (WAT)

Moxico is a municipality in Moxico Province, Angola. Its seat is in the city of Luena. The municipality occupies 38,999 square kilometres (15,058 sq mi) and has about 177,000 inhabitants. It is bordered to the north by the municipalities of Caocolo, Dala, Camanongue and Leua, the east by the municipalities of Lumeje and Alto Zambeze, the south by the municipalities of Bundas and Luchazes, and the west by the municipalities of Camacupa and Cuemba. It contains the communes of Luena, Cangumbe, Lucusse, Lutuai, and Muangai.
