= Belas, Luanda =

Coordinates: 8.9983°S 13.2650°E

Belas
- Municipality
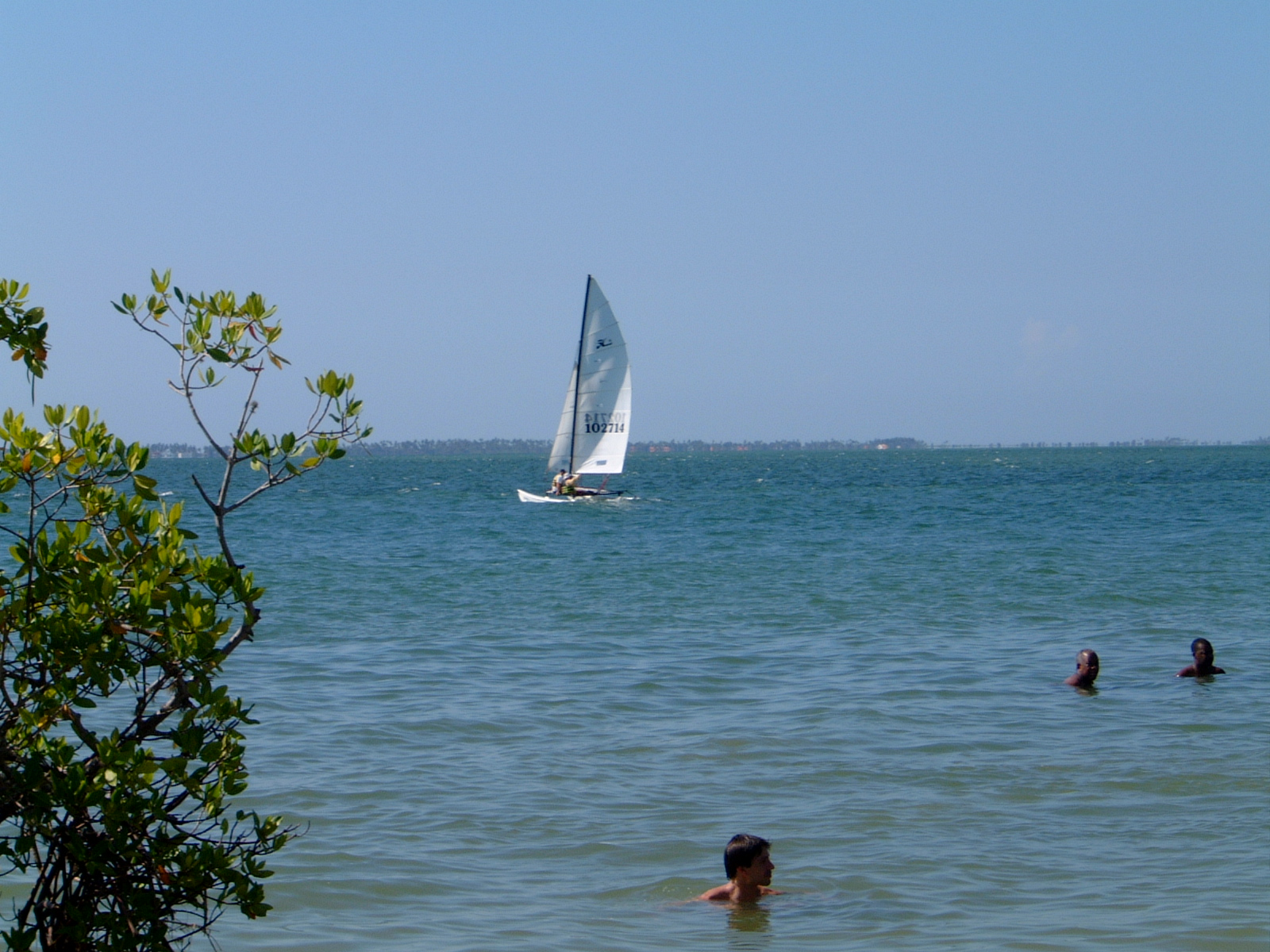

- Location in Angola
- Country: Angola
- Province: Luanda
- Ponta das Palmeirinhas Lighthouse
- Constructed: 1889 (first); 1936 (second)
- Foundation: concrete base
- Construction: steel skeletal tower (current) steel skeletal tower (first) cast iron skeletal tower (second & third)
- Height: 27 metres (89 ft) (current); 27 metres (89 ft) (first); 23 metres (75 ft) (second)
- Shape: quadrangular skeletal tower with balcony and light (current) square pyramidal skeletal tower atop a 1-storey building (first) octagonal pyramidal skeletal tower with balcony and lantern (second)
- Power source: solar power
- Operator: Instituto Marítimo e Portuário de Angola
- First lit: 1889
- Focal height: 40 metres (130 ft) (current)
- Range: 21 nautical miles (39 km; 24 mi)
- Characteristic: Fl W 4.5s.
- Angola no.: PT-5250

Belas is a city and one of the nine municipalities that make up the province of Luanda, as per the new administrative division of the province (the others being, Luanda, Cazenga, Cacuaco, Viana, Icolo e Bengo and Quiçama).

Belas was created by an administrative reform voted by the Angolan parliament on March 31, 2011. The administrative center is neighborhood Quilamba and the municipality administrator is Mrs. Joana Antónia Quintas.

== Geography ==
The municipality of Belas has an area of 1,046 km^{2} (404 sq mi).

== Demography ==
The municipality has a population of 1,271,854 (2019) with a population density of 1,216/km^{2}.

== Administrative Division ==
Commune	Area	Pop	Neighb	Vil
Benfica	361km^{2}	274,742	23	6
Camama	146km^{2}	631,741	28	
Futungo de Belas	20.7km^{2}	70,157	12	
Ilha do Mussulo	41.3km^{2}	7,798	7	
Barra do Cuanza	382km^{2}	5,779	6	
Quilamba	30.5km^{2}	56,183		
Ramiros	85.9km^{2}	28,708	6	

== Infrastructure and Education ==
Belas was established in 2011 to accommodate Luanda’s rapid suburban expansion. The district is planned around major developments like Kilamba and the affluent Talatona commercial district. The municipality houses key regional social infrastructure, including the 50,000-seat Estádio 11 de Novembro, and Belas Shopping Center, Angola's first large-scale modern mall. Its transport network relies heavily on connecting road corridors linked to central Luanda. The area is not served by formal public transportation but rather primarily by taxis and local minibuses (candongueiros). The EN-100 and Fidel Castro Expressway are two of the major closed access roads which run through the area.

The municipality of Belas has several campuses and centers of higher education, including the University of Belas and Agostinho Neto University.

== See also ==
- List of lighthouses in Angola
