= Nóqui =

- commune
- Country: Angola
- Province: Zaire
- Municipality: Noqui
- Time zone: UTC+1 (WAT)

Nóqui is a commune of Angola, located in the province of Zaire in the municipality Noqui.

== See also ==
- Communes of Angola
