= Bindo (disambiguation) =

Bindo is an American technology company.

Bindo may also refer to:

- Bindo, Angola, town
- Jolee Bindo, fictional character
- Mount Bindo, mountain in Australia

== People ==
- Bindo Altoviti (1491–1557), Italian banker
- Bindo Jibrilla (born 1963), Nigerian businessman
- Bindo Lanong (born 1976), Indian politician
- Bindo Maserati (1883–1980), Italian automotive engineer
