= Talatona =

City in Luanda, Angola

Coordinates: 8°55′S 13°11′E

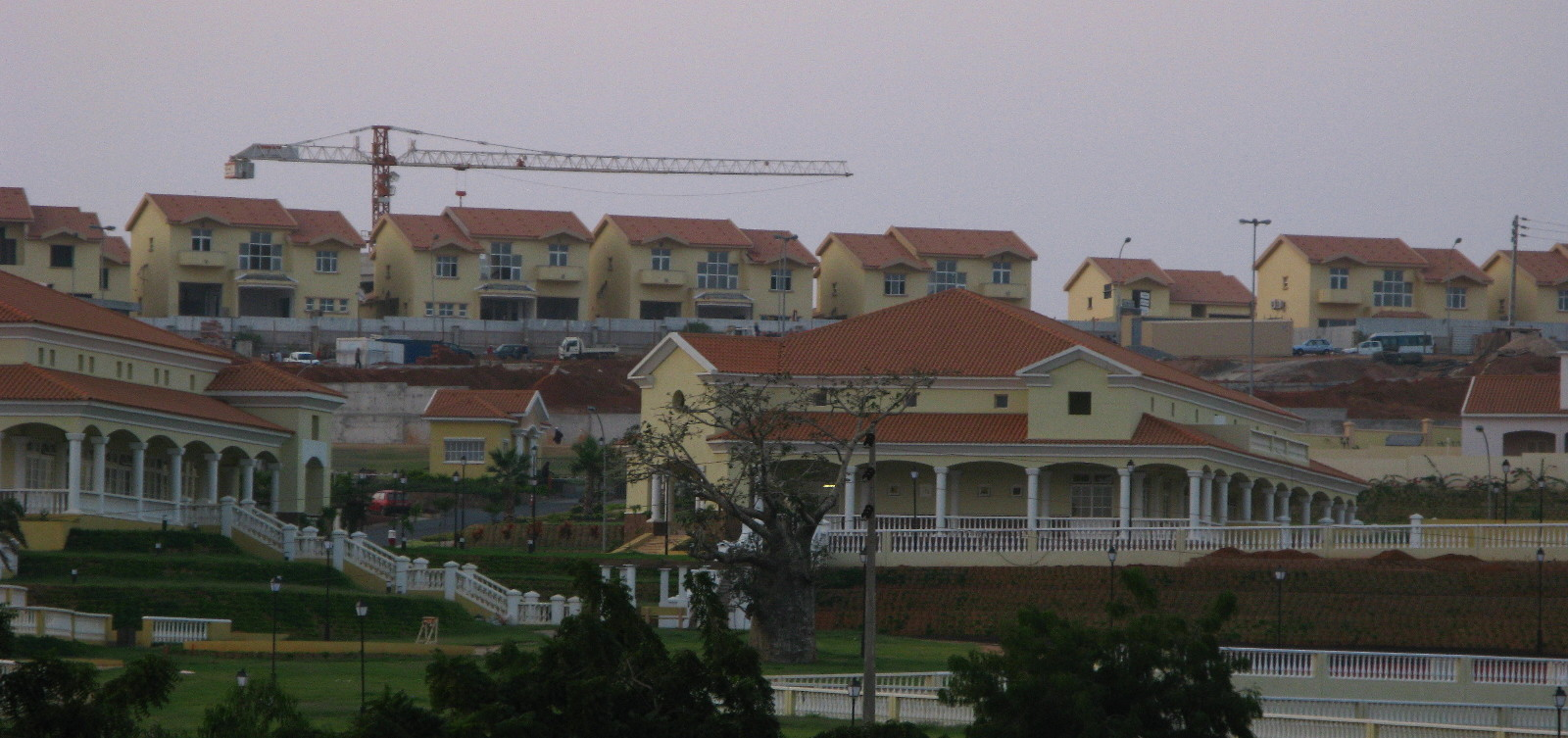
Talatona, in 2009.

Talatona is a city and municipality in the province of Luanda, bordering the Angolan capital, Luanda.

It was designed by the Angolan government to reduce traffic in central Luanda; Its infrastructure was built in a location south of Luanda, which currently houses several administrative and economic services that were relocated from the central zone of the capital. According to the 2018 population projections prepared by the National Institute of Statistics, it has a population of approximately 500,000 inhabitants. It is made up of the headquarters commune, which also bears the name Talatona, and the commune of Benfica; It is further subdivided into the urban districts of Camama, Futungo de Belas and Quifica. The municipal territory is bathed by the bay of Mussulo, managing two islands that are in this one, being the islet of Birds and the island of Desterro.
