= Mbridge River =

River in Angola

Mbridge (Angola)

The Mbridge or Mebridege is a river in northern Angola. Its mouth is at the Atlantic Ocean near the town of N'Zeto in Zaire Province. Its origin is near the city of Cuimba, and it forms part of the boundary between Zaire and Uige Provinces. Its tributaries include the Lufunde, the Lucunga, the Luqueia, and Lufua.

Construction of a bridge over the river near N'Zeto was expected to be complete in late 2013.

The river mouth and sand spit were featured on a 2008 stamp issued by Angola.

== See also ==
- List of rivers of Angola
