= José Sánchez del Río =

Mexican Cristero and Saint (1913–1928)

Saint José Luis Sánchez del Río
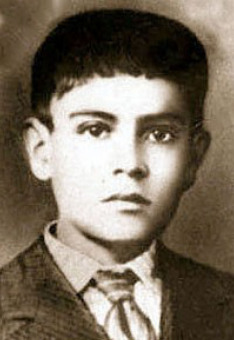
- Photograph of José Sánchez del Río

Martyr
- Born: March 28, 1913; Sahuayo, Michoacán, Mexico
- Died: February 10, 1928 (aged 14); Sahuayo, Michoacán, Mexico
- Venerated in: Catholic Church
- Beatified: November 20, 2005, Guadalajara, Mexico by Cardinal José Saraiva Martins (on behalf of Pope Benedict XVI)
- Canonized: October 16, 2016, Saint Peter's Square, Vatican City by Pope Francis
- Feast: February 10
- Attributes: Crucifix; Palm branch
- Patronage: Persecuted Christians; Children; Adolescents; Sahuayo

José Sánchez del Río ("Joselito) (March 28, 1913 – February 10, 1928) was a 14-year-old Mexican Cristero put to death by soldiers of the Mexican Army because he refused to renounce his Catholic faith. His death was seen as a largely political venture on the part of government officials in their attempt to stamp out dissent and crush religious freedom in the area.

He was declared venerable on June 22, 2004, by Pope John Paul II and was beatified on November 20, 2005, in Mexico. On January 21, 2016, Pope Francis approved a miracle attributed to him, allowing for his canonization; he was made a saint on October 16, 2016.

== Background ==
The Cristero War started when the government began eliminating the religious rights of Catholics and after it closed the churches and started seizing church properties throughout the country, in accordance with anti-clerical laws written into the Mexican Constitution.

President Plutarco Elías Calles, who took office in 1924, focused on the Roman Catholic Church, which led to seizure of church property, the closing of religious schools and convents, and the exile or the execution of priests.

== Life and Cristero War ==
José Luis Sánchez del Río was born on March 28, 1913, in Sahuayo, Michoacán. He attended school first in his hometown, then in Guadalajara in Jalisco.

When the Cristero War broke out in 1926, his brothers joined the rebel forces, but his mother would not allow him to take part. The rebel general, Prudencio Mendoza Alcazar, also refused his enlistment. The boy insisted that he wanted the chance to give his life for Jesus Christ and so come to Heaven easily. Mendoza relented and allowed José to become the flagbearer of the troop. The Cristeros nicknamed him Tarcisius, after the early Christian saint who was martyred for protecting the Eucharist from desecration.

During heavy fighting on January 25, 1928, a General Mendoza had his horse killed and José gave his horse to the man so that he could flee. Then he sought cover and fired at the enemy until he ran out of ammunition. The government troops captured the boy and imprisoned him.

=== Torture and death ===
It was then reported that José was captured by government forces, who ordered him to renounce his faith in Christ, under threat of death. He refused to accept apostasy.

To break his resolve, he was made to watch the hanging of another Cristero that they had in custody, but instead José encouraged the man, saying that they would soon meet again in Heaven after death. In prison, José prayed the Rosary daily and wrote an emotional letter to his mother, saying that he was ready to fulfill the will of God to whom he dedicated himself. His father attempted to raise a ransom to save him, but was not able to appease the government in time to do so, thus failing to secure the release of his son.

Others recalled the gruesome events that transpired after the government's failure to break José's resolve on the evening of February 10, 1928: "Consequently they cut the bottom of his feet and obliged him to walk around the town toward the cemetery. They also at times cut him with a machete until he was bleeding from several wounds. He cried and moaned with pain, but he did not give in. At times they stopped him and said, 'If you shout, 'Death to Christ the King' we will spare your life". José would only shout, "Yo nunca voy a ceder! Viva Cristo Rey!" ("I will never give in. Long live Christ the King!")

=== Burial and relics ===
The remains of José Luis Sánchez del Río are enshrined above a side altar in the Church of Saint James the Apostle in Sahuayo, his hometown.

== Beatification process ==
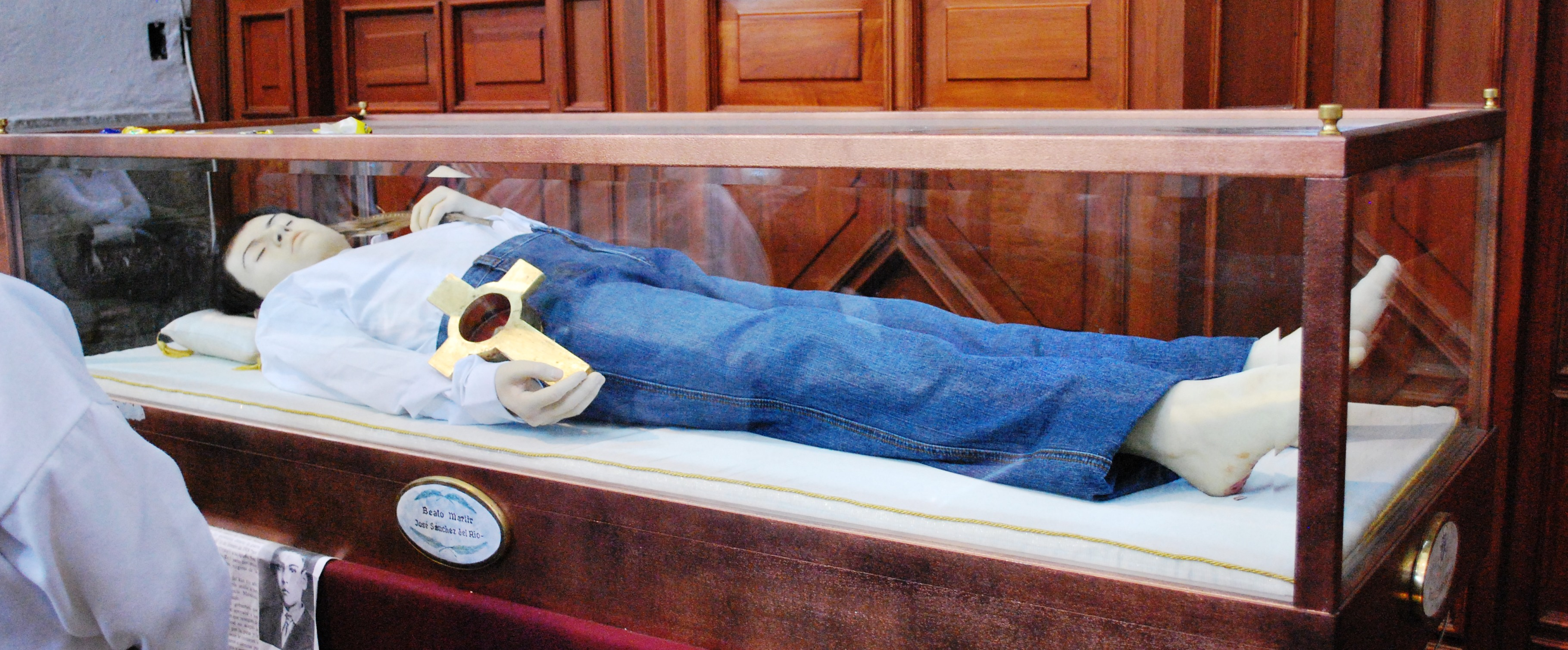
Way reliquary of José Sánchez del Rio, with the relic contained in the cross

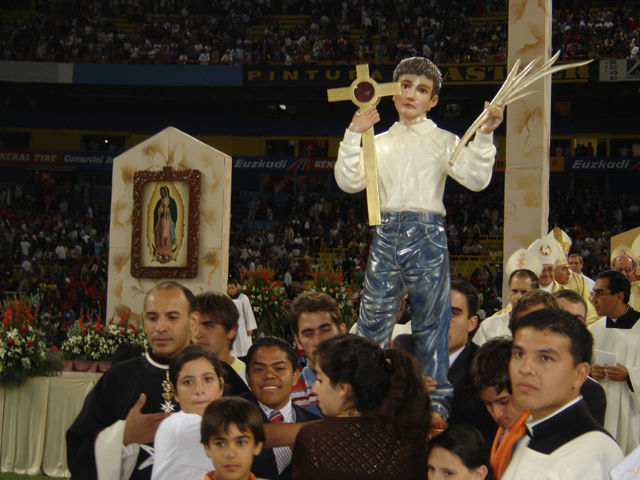
Beatification in the stadium of Guadalajara, Mexico

The beatification process opened in Zamora on May 1, 1996 in a diocesan process that continued until October 25, 1996. A week prior to the conclusion of that phase the Congregation for the Causes of Saints declared nihil obstat ("nothing against") to the cause on October 21, 1996; this granted him the title Servant of God. The process was later ratified on November 29, 2002, and allowed for officials to draft and submit in 2003 the positio on his martyrdom.

Pope John Paul II approved the findings on June 22, 2004, thus allowing Del Rio's beatification. He was beatified by Pope Benedict XVI on November 20, 2005, in Mexico; the Cardinal-Prefect of the Congregation for the Causes of Saints presided on behalf of the pontiff.

The miracle attributed to José Luis Sánchez del Río was the inexplicable recovery of a baby in Mexico who doctors said had no hope of survival. Pope Francis approved the miracle as being directly attributed to del Rio's intercession on January 21, 2016, and confirmed at an ordinary consistory of cardinals on March 15, 2016. Del Rio was canonised on October 16, 2016.

== Legacy ==
The "Blessed José Sánchez del Río High School Seminary" was established in 2008 in Mankato, Minnesota by Father Carlos Miguel Buela of the Institute of the Incarnate Word (IVE) (Spanish: Instituto del Verbo Encarnado), a Roman Catholic religious institute. The junior (middle) high school and high school is a preparatory seminary quartered on the 1854 parish grounds of the Saints Peter and Paul Catholic Church in Mankato, Minnesota. The school's teen and young adult students are known collectively as "The Minor Seminarians".

The newly named "St. José Sánchez del Río Catholic School" is located in San Antonio, Texas. Under the auspice of the Archdiocese of San Antonio, Archbishop Gustavo Garcia-Siller renamed the school prior to the start of the 2019–2020 school year. The school's mascot are the "Defenders of the Faith" in line with the charism of San Joselito and uses the rosary, Virgen de Guadalupe, and a palm as symbols of his devotion and faith. In 2021 the school closed and soon the campus was dedicated as the new St. Jose Sanchez Del Rio Catholic Church parish. The gymnasium has been repurposed as the church where Mass is celebrated every day. The new parish is growing fast with religious education and many ministries available to the approximately 450 families registered as parishioners as of early 2023.

== In popular culture ==
José Luis Sánchez del Río is one of the characters portrayed in the film For Greater Glory (2012) which depicts the story of the Cristero War and also depicts his martyrdom.

== See also ==
- Saints of the Cristero War
