= Moxico Province =

Province of Angola

Coordinates: 12°S 20°E

Moxico
- Province
- Moxico, province of Angola
- Country: Angola
- Capital: Luena

Government
  - Governor: Ernesto Muangala
  - Vice-Governor for the Political, Social and Economic Sector: Elizabeth Mafo Sapato Ayala
  - Vice-Governor for Technical Services and Infrastructure: Wilson Agnelo Chinhama Augusto

Area
  - Total: 126,432 km^{2} (48,816 sq mi)

Population (2024)
  - Total: 574,253
  - Density: 4.54199/km^{2} (11.7637/sq mi)
- Area code: 254
- ISO 3166 code: AO-MOX
- Website: www.moxico.gov.ao

Moxico (Portuguese spelling) is a province of Angola.

It used to have an area of 223,023 square kilometres (86,110 mi^{2}), which corresponded to 18% of the landmass of Angola. The province has a population of 758,568 according to the 2014 census, and a population density of approximately 3.4 residents per km^{2} (8.8/sq mi), making it one of the most sparsely populated areas of Angola. The eastern most part of the province has since become its own province, Moxico Leste.

Luena is the capital of the Moxico Province, and is located 1,314 kilometres (816 mi) from the Angolan capital of Luanda.

== History ==
Moxico Province was the scene of much guerrilla fighting during the Angolan Civil War. Its long border with Zambia at the east of the province was a base of operations for UNITA and MPLA. As a result, Moxico Province saw many raids by the military of South Africa.

Moxico Province is known as the place where UNITA rebel leader Jonas Savimbi was killed in 2002, signalling an end to over a quarter-century civil war in Angola. Savimbi's body was buried in the village of Lucusse, about 1,000 kilometres (620 mi) south-east of the capital, Luanda, under a tree near where he was killed.

== Geography ==
Moxico Province borders Lunda Sul Province to the north, Bié Province to the west, the Provinces of Cuando and Cubango to the south, the nation of Zambia and the Moxico Leste Province to the east.

== Municipalities ==
The province of Moxico contains nine municipalities (Portuguese: municípios):

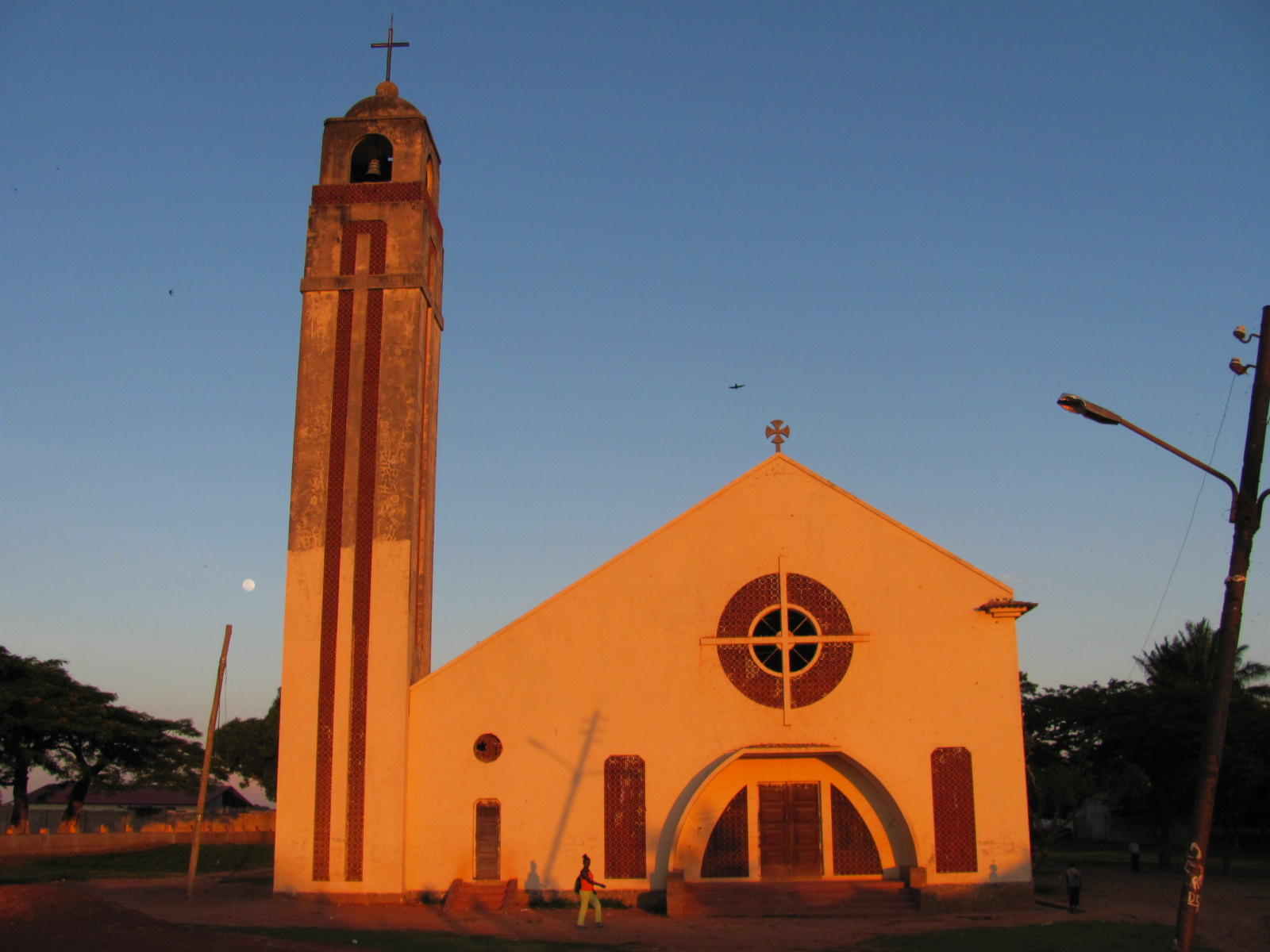
Church in Luena, Moxico Province

1. Bundas (Lumbala-N'guimbo)
2. Camanongue
3. Léua
4. Luchazes
5. Moxico (Luena)

== Communes ==
The province of Moxico contains the following communes (Portuguese: comunas), sorted by their respective municipalities:

- Alto Zambeze Municipality – Caianda (Kaianda), Calunda, Cazombo, Lóvua Leste (Lóvua do Zambeze), Lumbala-Caquengue (Lumbala-Kakengue), Macondo, Nana Candundo (Candundo)
- Bundas Municipality – Chiume, Lumbala-Guimbo (Lumbala-N'guimbo) Lutembo, Luvuei, Mussuma, Ninda, Sessa
- Camanongue Municipality – Camanongue
- Cameia Municipality – Cameia (Lumeje)
- Léua Municipality – Léua, Liangongo
- Luau Municipality – Luau
- Luacano Municipality – Lago-Dilolo, Luacano
- Luchazes Municipality – Cangamba (Kangamba), Cangombe, Cassamba, Muié, Tempué
- Moxico Municipality – Cangumbe (Kangumbe), Cachipoque, Lucusse, Luena, Lutuai (Muangai)

== Demographics ==
Moxico Province is composed of a diversity of ethnic groups, and is primarily a Bantu area. Populations of Chokwe, Lovale, Mbunda, Lucazi, and Ovimbundu make up the majority of the province. Isolated communities of other ethnic groups exist throughout Moxico.

Chokwe language is the most commonly spoken language in the province.

== List of governors ==
Name	Years in office
Armando Fernando Ndembo	1976–1979
Maj. Marques Monakapui Bassovava	1979–1981
Celestino Figueiredo Tchinhama Faísca	1981–1983
Maj. João Manuel Gonçalves Lourenço *	1983–1986
Jaime Baptista Ndonge	1986–1992
João Ernesto dos Santos Liberdade	1992–2017
Gonçalves Manuel Muandumba	2017–present

Up to 1991, the official name was Provincial Commissioner.

== See also ==
- Caianda
