= Esperança Gicaso =

Angolan paralympic athlete (b. 1992)

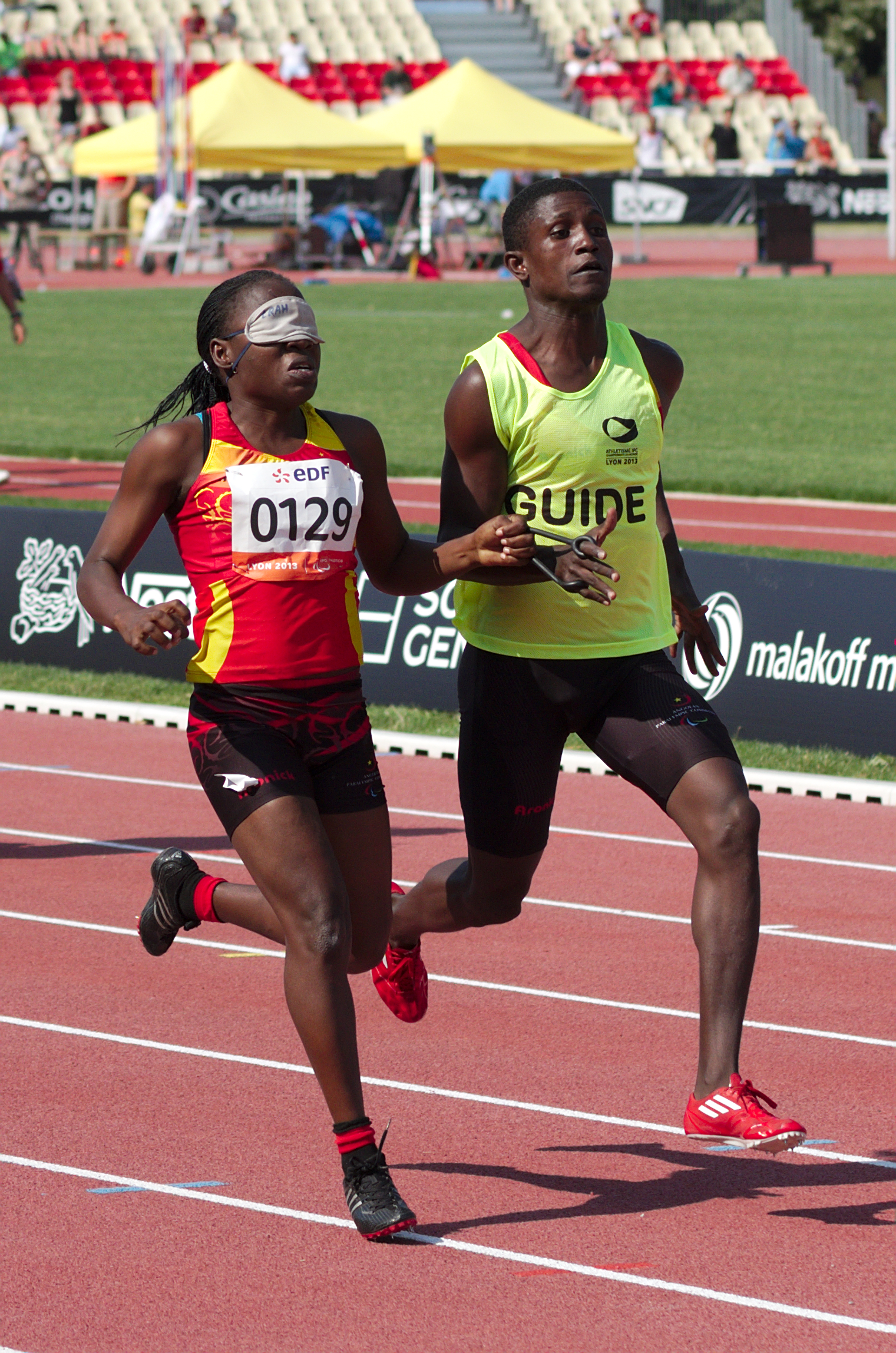
- Gicaso and guide Isaac Vieria Adao at the 2013 IPC Athletics World Championships

Esperança Gicaso (born 2 July 1992) is an Angolan para-athletics competitor. She served as Angola's flagbearer at the 2016 Summer Paralympics. Gicaso competes in the T11 classification for blind athletes.

== Career highlights ==
Gicaso began her athletic training in 2008. In 2011, she won the bronze medal in the 100 metres T11 event at the African Games in Maputo, Mozambique. She competed at the 2012 Summer Paralympics in the 100 metres T11 and 200 metres T11, and the 400 metres T12 events. She did not advance to the finals for these events.

At the 2013 IPC Athletics World Championships in Lyon, France, Gicaso earned the bronze medal in the 200 metres T11. At the 2015 African Games in Brazzaville, Republic of the Congo, she won the bronze medal in the 100 metres T11.

Gicaso was Angola's flagbearer during the opening ceremonies of the 2016 Summer Paralympics in Rio de Janeiro. She competed in the 100 metres, 200 metres, and 400 metres T11 events.

At the 2017 World Para Athletics Championships in London, Gicaso won the silver medal in the 100 metres T11 and the bronze medal in the 200 metres T11. She was named the Most Valuable Player of 2017 by the Olympic Athletes Association of Angola.

== Personal life ==
Gicaso lives in Maianga, Angola. She teaches Portuguese at a school in Luanda.
