= Lussenga =

Lussenga may be:

- places in Angola:
  - Lussenga, Zaire 6°59′S 13°7′E
  - Lussenga, Uíge, 6°39′S 15°0′E
