= Lumbala Airport =

Airport in Angola

- IATA: GGC; ICAO: FNBL

Summary
- Airport type: Public
- Serves: Lumbala N'guimbo
- Elevation AMSL: 3,510 ft / 1,070 m
- Coordinates: 14°06′18″S 21°27′00″E

Map
- Location of Lumbala Airport in Angola

Runways
Direction	Length		Surface
Direction	m	ft	Surface
10/28	1,966	6,450	Gravel
- Source: GCM Landings.com Google Maps

Lumbala Airport (IATA: GGC, ICAO: FNBL) is an airport serving the town of Lumbala N'guimbo in the Moxico Province of Angola.

== See also ==
- List of airports in Angola
- Transport in Angola
