= Quendo =

Coordinates: 12°44′S 14°23′E

- commune
- Location in Angola
- Country: Angola
- Province: Benguela Province
- Time zone: UTC+1 (WAT)
- Climate: Aw

Quendo is a commune in Benguela Province in Angola.
