= Cazeje =

- commune
- Country: Angola
- Province: Lunda Sul
- Time zone: UTC+1 (WAT)

Cazeje is a town and commune of Angola, located in the province of Lunda Sul.

== See also ==
- Communes of Angola
