= Lumbala N'guimbo =

- Commune
- Location in Angola
- Country: Angola
- Province: Moxico
- Municipality: Bundas

Area
  - Total: 1,580 sq mi (4,080 km^{2})

Population (2014)
  - Total: 30,297
  - Density: 19.2/sq mi (7.43/km^{2})
- Time zone: UTC+1 (WAT)

Lumbala N'guimbo, also spelled Lumbala-Nguimbo, is a town and commune in Angola located in Moxico Province, belonging to the Bundas Municipality, serving as the municipal headquarters.

== Demographics ==
As of 2020, Lumbala has approximately 35,000 inhabitants, making it a medium-sized town.

== Language ==
About half of the population speaks Portuguese as their first language, while the rest speak Bantu languages. There is a small community of English speakers from Zambia.

== Religion ==
The majority of the population is Roman Catholic. There are also small communities of adherents to traditional African religions and Protestant Christianity.

== Economy ==
The economy of Lumbala N'guimbo is based on agriculture, non-intensive livestock farming, timber extraction, and small-scale commerce. Lumbala N'guimbo has its own bank, BPC (Banco de Poupança e Crédito). The Lumbala N'guimbo branch is affiliated with BPC, an Angolan bank. Additionally, Lumbala Guimbo has its own airport, which boosts the region's economy.

== See also ==
- Communes of Angola
