= Xassengue =

Coordinates: 10°28′S 18°32′E

- commune
- Location in Angola
- Country: Angola
- Province: Lunda Sul
- Time zone: UTC+1 (WAT)

Xassengue is a town and commune in Angola, located in Lunda Sul Province in the northeastern part of the country. The area is part of Angola’s interior and is characterized by a predominantly rural landscape and communities whose livelihoods are connected to agriculture and local economic activities. Lunda Sul is known for its rich cultural heritage and is also associated with diamond mining, which has played an important role in the province’s economy. Xassengue forms part of the administrative structure of Lunda Sul and serves as a local center for the surrounding communities.

== See also ==
- Communes of Angola
