= Chiume =

Coordinates: 15°08′S 21°11′E

- commune
- Location in Angola
- Country: Angola
- Province: Moxico
- Time zone: UTC+1 (WAT)

Chiume is a town and commune of Angola, located in the province of Moxico.

== See also ==
- Communes of Angola
