= Luma Cassai =

Coordinates: 11°14′S 19°47′E

- commune
- Location in Angola
- Country: Angola
- Province: Lunda Sul
- Time zone: UTC+1 (WAT)

Luma Cassai is a town and commune of Angola, located in the province of Lunda Sul.

== See also ==
- Communes of Angola
