= Alto-Chikapa =

Coordinates: 10°56′S 19°09′E

- commune
- Location in Angola
- Country: Angola
- Province: Lunda Sul
- Time zone: UTC+1 (WAT)

Alto-Chikapa is a town and commune of Angola, located in the province of Lunda Sul.

== See also ==
- Communes of Angola
