= Muié =

Coordinates: 14°21′S 20°25′E

- commune
- Location in Angola
- Country: Angola
- Province: Moxico
- Time zone: UTC+1 (WAT)

Muié is a town and commune of Angola, located in the province of Moxico.

== See also ==
- Communes of Angola
