= Lobito, Canata =

Canata, Lobito
- commune
- Location in Angola
- Coordinates: 12°22′S 13°33′E
- Country: Angola
- Province: Benguela Province
- Time zone: UTC+1 (WAT)
- Climate: Aw

Canata, Lobito is a commune in Benguela Province in Angola.
