= Cangumbe =

City in Angola

- City
- Location within Angola
- Coordinates: 11°57′27.68″S 19°12′16.84″E
- Country: Angola
- Province: Moxico

Population
  - Total: 4,849
- Time zone: UTC+1:00 (WAT)

Cangumbe is a city in the Moxico Province of Angola. It has a population of 12,110 as of 2014.
