= N'zeto Airport =

Airport in Angola

N'Zeto/Ambrizete Airport
- IATA: ARZ; ICAO: FNZE

Summary
- Airport type: Private
- Serves: N'Zeto
- Elevation AMSL: 69 ft / 21 m
- Coordinates: 7°15′25″S 12°51′50″E

Map
- Location of N'Zeto/Ambrizete Airport in Angola

Runways
Direction	Length		Surface
Direction	m	ft	Surface
04/22	2,230	7,316	Grass
- Source: GCM Landings.com Google Maps

N'zeto Airport (IATA: ARZ, ICAO: FNZE) is an airport serving N'zeto, a town in Zaire Province, Angola. The runway is 2.5 kilometres (1.6 mi) south of the town, along the Atlantic coast.

== See also ==
- List of airports in Angola
- Transport in Angola
