= Lunda Sul Province =

Province of Angola

Coordinates: 10°19′S 20°49′E

Lunda Sul
- Province
- Lunda Sul, province of Angola
- Country: Angola
- Capital: Saurimo

Government
  - Governor: Daniel Félix Neto
  - Vice-Governor for the Political, Economic and Social Sector: Mendes Lourenco Gaspar
  - Vice-Governor for Technical Services and Infrastructures: Esmeraldino Claudio Pemessa Abreu

Area
  - Total: 77,637 km^{2} (29,976 sq mi)

Population (2014 census)
  - Total: 537,587
  - Density: 6.9244/km^{2} (17.934/sq mi)
- ISO 3166 code: AO-LSU
- HDI (2018): 0.568 medium · 5th
- Website: www.lundasul.gov.ao

Lunda Sul Province is not to be confused with Luanda Sul, a satellite city of Luanda, the capital of Angola.

Lunda Sul ("South Lunda") is a province of Angola. It has an area of 77,637 km^{2} and a 2014 census population of 537,587. Saurimo is the provincial capital.

== Geography and climate ==
The Lunda Sul province is located in the extreme east of Angola, the capital of Saurimo located 946 kilometres (588 mi) by road east of the capital Luanda. It is bordered to the north by Lunda Norte Province, to the east by the Democratic Republic of the Congo, to the south by Moxico and Moxico Leste provinces, southwest by Bié Province, and to the west by Malanje Province. The main road from Luanda to Lubumbashi traverses the province from west to east.

The province is dominated by dry savannah land; only in the Kasai River valley are there remnants of tropical rainforest. The Kasai forms the eastern and southern frontier of Lunda Sul and is the main river of the province. The Kwango River is also a major river of the province. The climate of the province is predominantly tropical.

== Municipalities ==
The province of Lunda Sul contains four municipalities (Portuguese: municípios):

- Cacolo
- Dala
- Muconda
- Saurimo

== Communes ==
The province of Lunda Sul contains the following communes (Portuguese: comunas), sorted by their respective municipalities:

- Cacolo Municipality: – Alto-Chicapa (Alto-Chikapa), Cacolo, Cucumbi (Kukumbi), Xassengue
- Dala Municipality: – Cazage (Cazeje), Dala, Luma Cassai
- Muconda Municipality: – Cassai Sul (Kassai Sul), Chiluage, Muconda, Muriege (Murieje)
- 'Saurimo Municipality: – Mona-Quimbundo (Mona-Kimbundo), Saurimo, Sombo

== Economy and social issues ==
Economically the province is dominated by peanut cultivation, which is operated primarily in the Saurimo area. In the south of the province maize production is major contributing factor. Other agricultural products include rice, cassava and cereals. This region is rich with diamonds, manganese and iron which are exploited; Catoca mine in Lunda Sul Province is the fourth largest diamond mine in the world. Due to warfare in the region, at times mining has been disrupted by attacks form the UNITA, especially in 1999-2000. In spring 1999, UNITA destroyed the bridge on the Kasai River at Biula, affecting transport communications in the region between Lunda Sul and Moxico.

Like in many other areas of Angola, landmines are a serious problem, and it is described as being "severely mined". As of 1995, some 30 major or strategic bridges and 58 secondary bridges had been destroyed in the province according to Oxfam reports. "Forced return and restrictions to freedom of movement" by people has been noted in the province, and the Huambo and Cuando Cubango provinces.

== Demographics ==
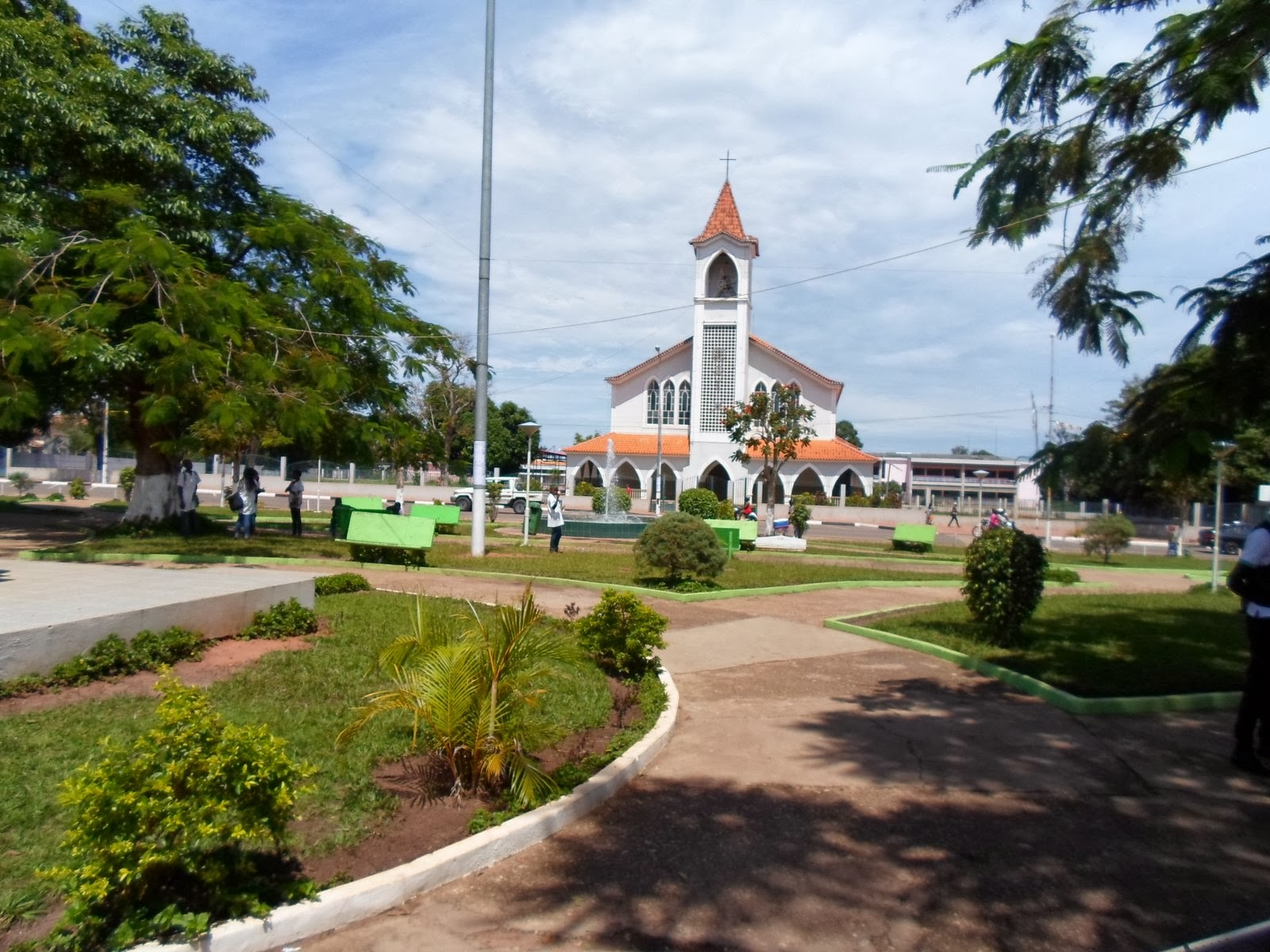
A church in Lunda Sul Province

The origin of the province's population belongs to the ethnic groups of the Lunda and Chokwe people, which are closely connected historically. They are mainly involved in agriculture. There are also many immigrants from other parts of the country, working for the Endiama or as independent diamond miners. The struggle between the Lunda and Chokwe to obtain wealth from the diamond industry has increased tension in the province.

== List of governors of Lunda Sul ==
Name	Years in office
José Manuel Salukombo	1978–1978
Celestino Figueiredo Tchinhama Faísca	1978–1981
Lt. Col. José César Augusto Kiluanji	1981–1983
Luís Dokui Paulo de Castro	1983–1986
Rafael Sapilinha Sambalanga	1986–1988
Graciano Mande	1988–1992
José Manuel Salucombo	1992–1993
Moisés Nele	1993–1997
Domingos Oliveira	1998–1999
Francisco Sozinho Chiuissa	1999–2002
Miji Muachissengue	2002–2008
Cândida Maria Guilherme Narciso	2008–2017
Ernesto Fernando Kiteculo	2017–2018
Daniel Félix Neto	2018–

Up to 1991, the official name was Provincial Commissioner
