= Kaianda =

Commune in Angola

- Town and commune
- Location in Angola
- Coordinates: 11°00′S 23°32′E
- Country: Angola
- Province: Moxico
- Time zone: UTC+1 (WAT)

Kaianda is a town and commune of Angola, located in the province of Moxico.

== See also ==
- Communes of Angola
