= Luchazes =

Town and municipality in Moxico Province, Angola

- Suburb
- Location within Angola
- Coordinates: 13°42′04″S 19°51′36″E
- Country: Angola
- Province: Moxico

Population (2014)
  - Total: 14,451
- Time zone: UTC+1:00 (WAT)

Luchazes was until 2024 a town and municipality in Moxico Province, Angola, and is now a suburb of Cangamba.

== See also ==
- Mbunda people
