= Mbuela =

Coordinates: 10°29′S 18°33′E

- commune
- Location in Angola
- Country: Angola
- Province: Malanje
- Time zone: UTC+1 (WAT)

Mbuela is a commune of Angola, located in the province of Malanje.

== See also ==
- Communes of Angola
