= Murieje =

Coordinates: 9°54′S 21°13′E

- commune
- Location in Angola
- Country: Angola
- Province: Lunda Sul
- Time zone: UTC+1 (WAT)

Murieje is a town and commune, located in the province of Lunda Sul, Angola.

== See also ==
- Communes of Angola
