= Belas Shopping =

Shopping mall in Luanda, Angola

Coordinates: 8°55′26.8″S 13°11′10.3″E

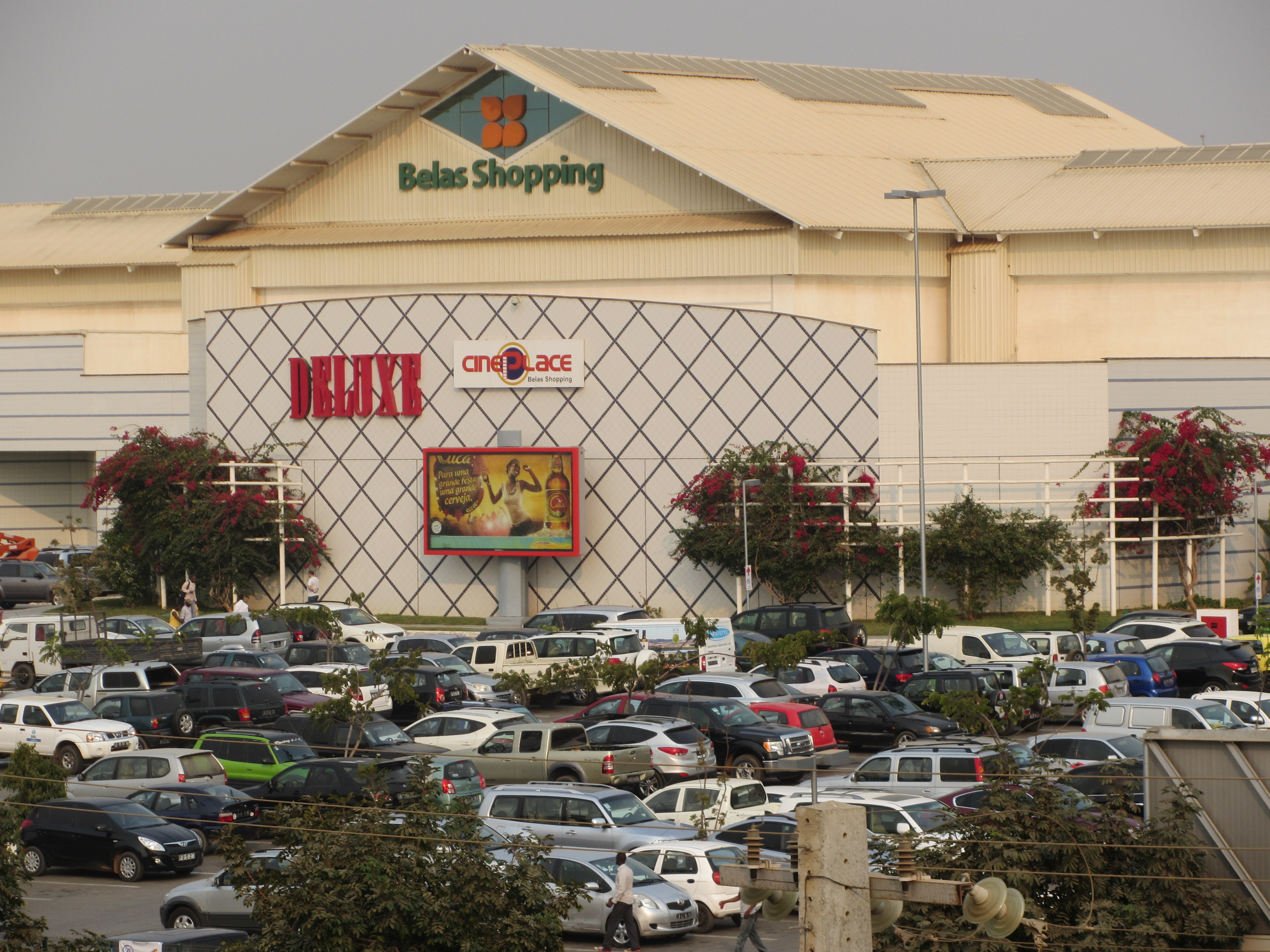
Belas Shopping mall

Belas Shopping is the first modern shopping center of Angola, located in the Talatona city, in Luanda Province. Covering an area of almost 120,000 square meters, with a budgeted investment initially of 35 million dollars, it was built by Angolan subsidiary Odebrecht. The official opening was on March 29, 2007, attended by government officials, politicians, entrepreneurs, the press, and others.

The mall has eight cinemas, a food court, entertainment area and more than one hundred stores. Around a thousand people were employed in its construction, and since opening it employs about 950 people directly and some 1500 jobs indirectly.
