= Ramiros =

- commune
- Location in Angola
- Country: Angola
- Province: Luanda
- Municipality: Belas

Area
  - Total: 33.2 sq mi (85.9 km^{2})

Population (2014)
  - Total: 28,708
  - Density: 866/sq mi (334/km^{2})
- Time zone: UTC+1 (WAT)

Ramiros is a commune located in Belas Municipality, the province of Luanda, in Angola.

== See also ==
- Communes of Angola
