= Kinanga =

- commune
- Country: Angola
- Province: Luanda
- Time zone: UTC+1 (WAT)

Kinanga is a town and commune of Angola, located in the province of Luanda.

== See also ==
- Communes of Angola
