= Kiende =

Coordinates: 6°25′S 14°04′E

- commune
- Location in Angola
- Country: Angola
- Province: Zaire
- Time zone: UTC+1 (WAT)

Kiende is a commune of Angola, located in the province of Zaire.

== See also ==
- Communes of Angola
