= Sessa, Angola =

Sessa
- Commune
- Country: Angola
- Province: Moxico
- Time zone: UTC+1 (WAT)

Sessa is a town and commune of Angola, located in the province of Moxico.

== See also ==
- Communes of Angola
