= Pedra de Feitiço =

- commune
- Country: Angola
- Province: Zaire
- Time zone: UTC+1 (WAT)

Pedra de Feitiço is a commune of Angola, located in the province of Zaire.

== See also ==
- Communes of Angola
