= Cote, Angola =

Cote
- commune
- Location in Angola
- Coordinates: 12°53′S 15°49′E
- Country: Angola
- Province: Benguela Province
- Time zone: UTC+1 (WAT)
- Climate: Aw

Cote is a commune in Benguela Province in Angola.
