= Quilamba =

Planned neighborhood and housing development in Angola

- Neighborhood
- Interactive map of Quilamba
- Coordinates: 9°00′S 13°16′E
- Country: Angola
- Province: Luanda
- Municipality: Belas
- Founder: China International Trust and Investment Corporation

Area
  - Total: 30.5 km^{2} (11.8 sq mi)
- Time zone: UTC+1:00 (WAT)

Quilamba (also called Kilamba) is a planned urban development located about 30 kilometres south of Luanda, Angola. It serves as the administrative center of Belas Municipality in Luanda Province. The city was built by the China International Trust and Investment Corporation (CITIC) as part of a government housing program and financed through a loan between the governments of Angola and China.

According to the Associated Press, Quilamba is considered the most successful new city development in Africa, with a population exceeding 130,000, and experts suggest it serves as a model for a dozen similar projects across the continent, from Zanzibar to Zambia.

== Development ==
The concept for Quilamba emerged in the aftermath of the Angolan Civil War (1975–2002), when the Angolan government sought to address housing shortages and expand access to urban infrastructure.

Construction began in 2008 under President José Eduardo dos Santos's housing initiative, which aimed to deliver one million new homes nationwide. The development was executed through a resources based framework in which Angola borrowed money from Chinese financial institutions with oil revenue used as collateral. As part of the financing arrangement CITIC, a Chinese state-owned enterprise, was responsible for design and construction.

The first phase covered about 30.5 square kilometres (11.8 sq mi) and was completed in 2011. It consisted of around 750 apartment buildings ranging from five to thirteen floors, as well as commercial areas, schools, and childcare facilities. Quilamba was designed as a self-contained community including residential, educational, and commercial facilities. The plan provided for over one hundred shops, more than a dozen schools, and other public amenities intended to support a projected population exceeding 200,000 residents. The design followed a high-density model with uniform apartment blocks and wide avenues laid out on a grid system. The total construction cost was about US$3.5 billion.

== Housing and financing ==
Initially, apartment prices were beyond the reach of most Angolans, averaging about US$125,000 per unit. As a result, occupancy remained low after completion in 2012, and international media described the site as a "ghost town."

In response, the government introduced mortgage subsidies and rent-to-own programs, and reduced unit prices to around US$70,000. Many apartments were subsequently reclassified as social housing and offered through public financing mechanisms. These measures led to a sharp increase in demand and population growth between 2013 and 2016.

== Population growth ==
By September 2013 the city was reported to have around 40,000 residents. Two years later the figure rose to about 80,000, and by 2019 population estimates reached roughly 129,000.

By the mid-2010s Quilamba had become one of the main residential areas for Luanda's salaried professionals and public sector employees. Scholars have described it as representative of Angola's postwar urbanization and of Chinese involvement in African infrastructure development.
