= Mangue Grande =

Coordinates: 6°43′S 12°37′E

- commune
- Location in Angola
- Country: Angola
- Province: Zaire
- Time zone: UTC+1 (WAT)

Mangue Grande is a commune of Angola, located in the province of Zaire in the North-West of the country.

== See also ==
- Communes of Angola
