= Cupupa =

- commune
- Country: Angola
- Province: Benguela Province
- Time zone: UTC+1 (WAT)
- Climate: Aw

Cupupa is a commune in Benguela Province in Angola.
