= Benfica, Luanda =

- commune
- Location in Angola
- Coordinates: 8.9315°S 13.1599°E
- Country: Angola
- Province: Luanda
- Municipality: Belas

Area
  - Total: 139 sq mi (361 km^{2})

Population (2014)
  - Total: 274,742
  - Density: 1,970/sq mi (761/km^{2})
- Time zone: UTC+1 (WAT)

Benfica, Luanda is a commune of Angola located in Belas Municipality, the province of Luanda. It was originally set up by Portuguese Angola as an area for integration of peoples from throughout the Portuguese Empire.

== History ==
Whilst Angola was under Portuguese control, Benfica was established as a planned colono (colony) with the intent that it would be a multicultural area. To assist this, settlers from the Azores and 93 settlers from Cape Verde were introduced to Benfica as farmers, though 14 had to return to Cape Verde due to ill-health. The Governor of Cape Verde objected to this as he felt it undermined his position. Despite this aim, inter-communal relations between the new Azorean and Cape Verdean settlers and native Africans were strained and the Governor of the Province expressed concern that Angolan nationalists would use it as an attempt to radicalise the native Africans against Portuguese rule. The Junta Provincial de Povoamento (JPP) (English: Provincial Settlement Board) also noted the Cape Verdeans were not inclined or willing to work on farms as they had been fishermen in Cape Verde and many turned to drink.

The area of Benfica is noted to have a number of deposits of mica underground. Benfica is the home of S.L. Benfica and their home ground of Estádio dos Coqueiros has hosted the Angola national football team. In 2022, Benfica was the location of a violent protest by taxi drivers against the MPLA government. This required the Rapid Intervention Police to be deployed to quell the protest. The MPLA offices in Benfica were vandalised and robbed again in 2023.

== See also ==
- Communes of Angola
