= Bindo, Angola =

Coordinates: 8°09′S 15°13′E

Bindo
- commune
- Location in Angola
- Country: Angola
- Province: Cuanza Norte
- Time zone: UTC+1 (WAT)
- Climate: Aw

Bindo is a town and commune of Angola, located in the province of Cuanza Norte.

== See also ==
- Communes of Angola
