= Mussulo, Angola =

Mussulo
- Municipality
- Location in Angola
- Coordinates: 08°52′01″S 13°08′58″E
- Country: Angola
- Province: Luanda Province

Area
  - Total: 16.61 sq mi (43.03 km^{2})

Population (2024 census)
  - Total: 15,283
- Time zone: UTC+1 (WAT)
- Climate: Aw

Mussulo, formerly Benfica e Mussulo, is a municipality in Luanda Province in Angola. It is located entirely on the Mussulo peninsula, in the coastal area of the Luanda Province. The municipality had a population of 15,283 in 2024.

== Administrative divisions ==
The municipality of Mussulo is made up of six neighborhoods, as follows:

- Ponta da Barra
- Contra Costa da Ponta da Barra
- Priori
- Macoco
- Cambaxi
- Mussulo Centro
- Contra Costa do Mussulo Centro
