= Institute of the Incarnate Word =

Catholic religious institute in Argentina

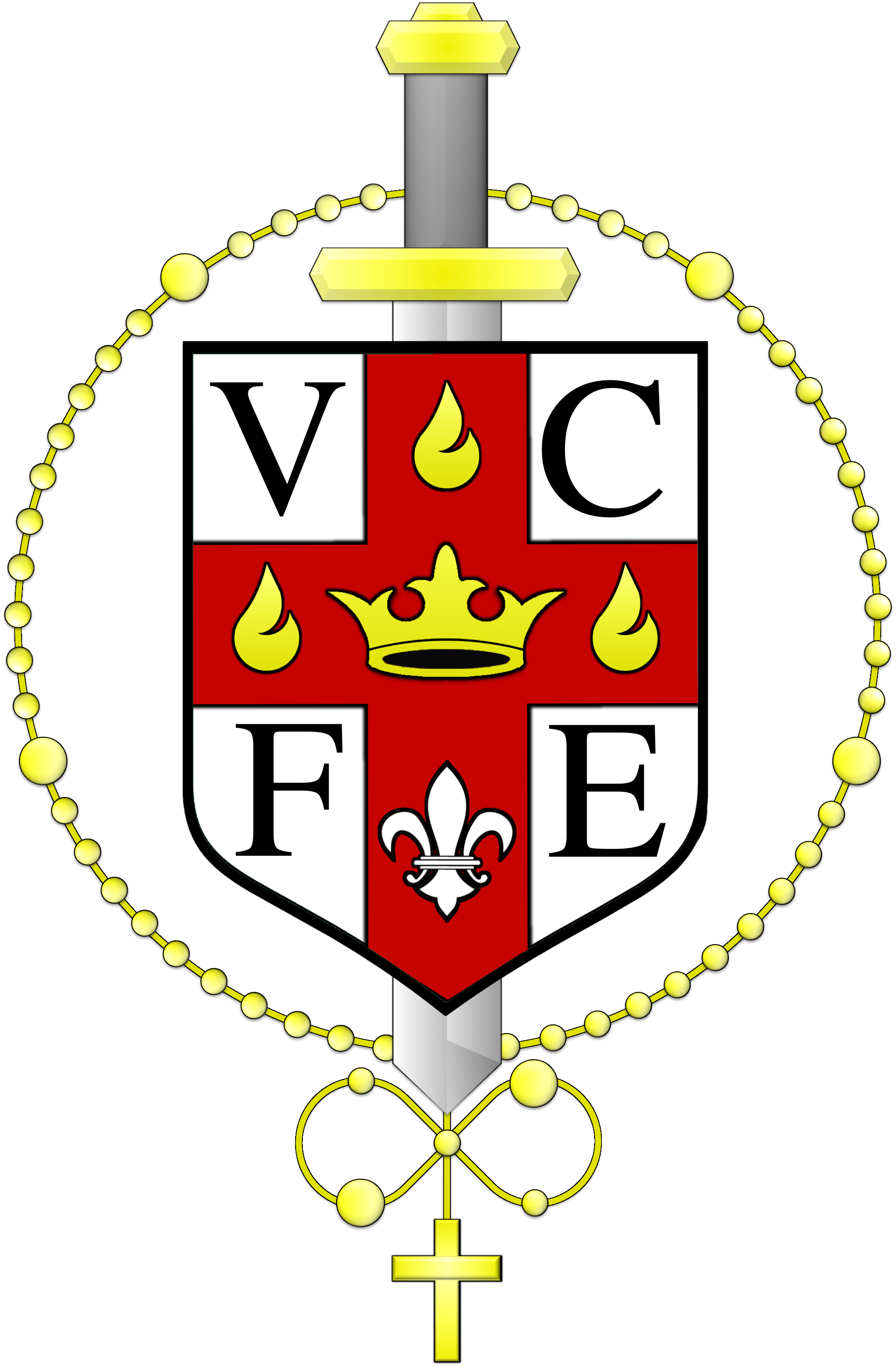
- Abbreviation: IVE
- Formation: March 25, 1984; 42 years ago
- Type: Catholic religious institute
- Headquarters: Piazza San Píetro, 2
- Location: Segni, Roma, Italia
- Superior General: Fr. Gustavo Nieto, IVE
- Key people: Carlos Miguel Buela - Founder
- Website: http://www.ive.org

The Institute of the Incarnate Word (Spanish: Instituto del Verbo Encarnado, IVE) is a Catholic religious institute founded in Argentina by Fr. Carlos Miguel Buela on March 25, 1984. It is a religious institute of diocesan right. The institute is the male branch of the Religious Family of the Incarnate Word, a union of religious institutes founded by Buela; the other two branches are the female religious community known as the Servants of the Lord and the Virgin of Matará (SSVM) and the Secular Third Order.

In December 2016, the institute's founder was sentenced by a Vatican tribunal for sexual misconduct with IVE seminarians and was forced to cut off all contact with members of the IVE while living his sentence doing penance and prayer.

== Overview ==
Members of the Institute profess the vows of chastity, poverty and obedience. In addition, a fourth vow of Marian slavery is professed following the practice of St. Louis-Marie Grignion de Montfort.

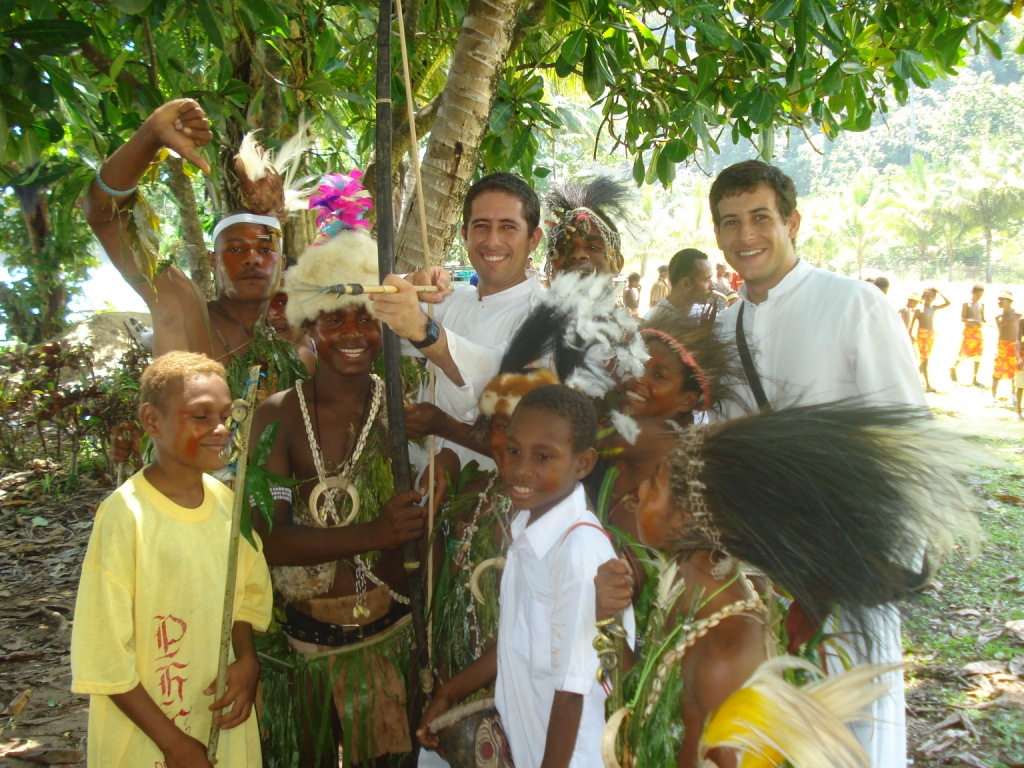
IVE Missionaries in Papua New Guinea.

According to its constitution, the specific charism of the Institute of the Incarnate Word is the evangelization of the culture (where ever they are), "to extend the Incarnation 'to all men, in the whole man, and in all of the manifestations of man,' in accordance with the teachings of the Magisterium of the Catholic Church." To accomplish this, the religious of the IVE profess the evangelical counsels of poverty, chastity, and obedience under vow and live in community. A fourth vow of "Slavery to Mary according to St. Louis-Marie Grignion de Montfort" is also made.

== History ==
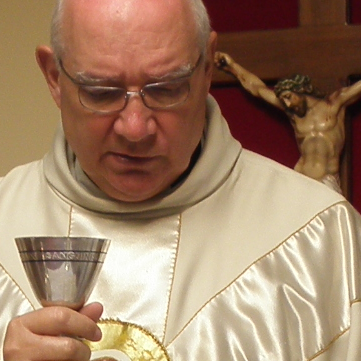
Fr. Carlos Miguel Buela, IVE celebrates Mass for missionaries of the Institute of the Incarnate Word in Canada.

Fr. Carlos Miguel Buela founded the Institute of the Incarnate Word in Argentina on March 25, 1984, on the Solemnity of the Annunciation with the approval of Bishop León Kruk in the Diocese of San Rafael. It began as a public association of the faithful, made up of priests from the archdioceses of Buenos Aires and Paraná. However, eventually only Buela remained of the founding group. In 1988, Buela founded a female branch, the Servants of the Lord and of the Virgin of Matará. In addition to professing evangelical counsels of poverty, chastity, and obedience, members take a fourth vow of "Marian slavery".

The association conflicted with the bishops of the region, establishing itself in other dioceses without the permission of the local ordinaries. As a result, none of the bishops of San Rafael considered the group to have met the canonical conditions to become an Institute of Consecrated Life. In the late 1990s, the Episcopal Conference of Argentina petitioned to the Holy See to have the order suppressed on account of various alleged abuses. The Holy See did not suppress the order, and authorized ordinations of IVE seminarians; for a number of years, Argentinian bishops had refused to ordain members of the order. However, Buela was forced to resign as the superior and leave the diocese of San Rafael. The order was allowed to establish itself in Italy, in the suburbicarian Diocese of Velletri–Segni.

After passing almost two decades in the initial stages as a new religious community, the IVE became a religious congregation of diocesan right on May 8, 2004 under the guidance of resident diocesan Bishop Andrea Maria Erba of the Diocese of Velletri-Segni near Rome, Italy, the site of the institute's main house. At the same time the Constitutions also received official approval by a competent authority of the Church. Mons. Erba had previously received the institute's General House in the year 2000.

On March 25, 2009, the Institute celebrated its 25th anniversary. A year later saw the election of a new General Superior, Fr. Carlos Walker, IVE, after the conviction of Buela for sexual abuse of seminarians in the institute.

In 2024, the first bishop from the Institute-Teodor Matsapula, was appointed as the Eparch of Mukachevo of the Ruthenians.

In January 2025, the Dicastery for Institutes of Consecrated Life and Societies of Apostolic Life, under the leadership of Sister Simona Brambilla, announced that Bishop José Antonio Satué and Sr. Clara Echarte would be pontifical delegates with full governing powers over the male and female branches of the IVE. The decree also established a three-year moratorium on new members joining the institutes. The Holy See stated that "severe deficits" existed in the institutes regarding vocational discernment and formation.

== Scandals ==
After the denunciation of seminarians accusing the founder of the Institute, Carlos Miguel Buela, of sexual abuse, a decree of the Congregation for Institutes of Consecrated Life, signed by Cardinal Gardin in 2010, judged these accusations to be plausible and found Buela guilty of inappropriate behavior with adults. He then had to leave Argentina and retire to the Abbey of La Pierre-Qui-Vire in France. In 2016, he moved to Genoa, Italy. The Institute of the Incarnate Word continues on its website to refer to its founder, honors him following his death, and remains silent on abuses. Several articles detail a persistent dispute with the Holy See, and a "shadow government" denounced by Cardinal Santos Abril, the Pontifical Commissioner of the congregation, which forbids any homage to the founder, who was dismissed by the Vatican under Benedict XVI. As of 2025, the Institute still showed honor to Buela and conducted pilgrimages to his tomb.

Cardinal Theodore McCarrick donated large sums of money, a total of over $1 million, to IVE toward IVE seminary expenses and Buela's care after his removal. McCarrick, who was found guilty of abusing seminarians after being publicly accused in 2018, had a close relationship with the IVE, ordaining many of its seminarians and for a time retiring in one of the IVE's seminaries.

== Specific locations ==
=== United States ===
The first IVE priests to come to the United States arrived in New York in December 1989, the SSVM sisters arriving shortly thereafter.

Several years later, given its rapid growth, the IVE officially established the Province of the Immaculate Conception which includes the United States, Canada, Mexico, and Guyana. The Institute began its American novitiate (St. Isaac Jogues & Companion Martyrs Novitiate) in 1998, its seminary (the Ven. Fulton Sheen House of Formation) in 1999, and a high school seminary (Bl. Jose Sanchez del Rio High School Seminary) in 2008. That same year in Guyana, the IVE also started a residence for boys who aspire to the priesthood. In the province there are currently 40 priests and about 75 young men in formation.

=== Tajikistan ===
John Paul II entrusted The Mission sui iuris in Tajikistan to the care of the Institute on September 29, 1997. As the Holy See indicates, a mission sui iuris is a special missionary territory which is not part of any diocese, vicariate, or apostolic jurisdiction. Thus, to provide an organized structure to such a territory, the Pope appoints a religious superior as the highest-ranking Church authority within its boundaries. As of 2005 Tajikistan had only 245 Catholics being tended to by five priests, all of whom belong to the institute.

=== Missions ===
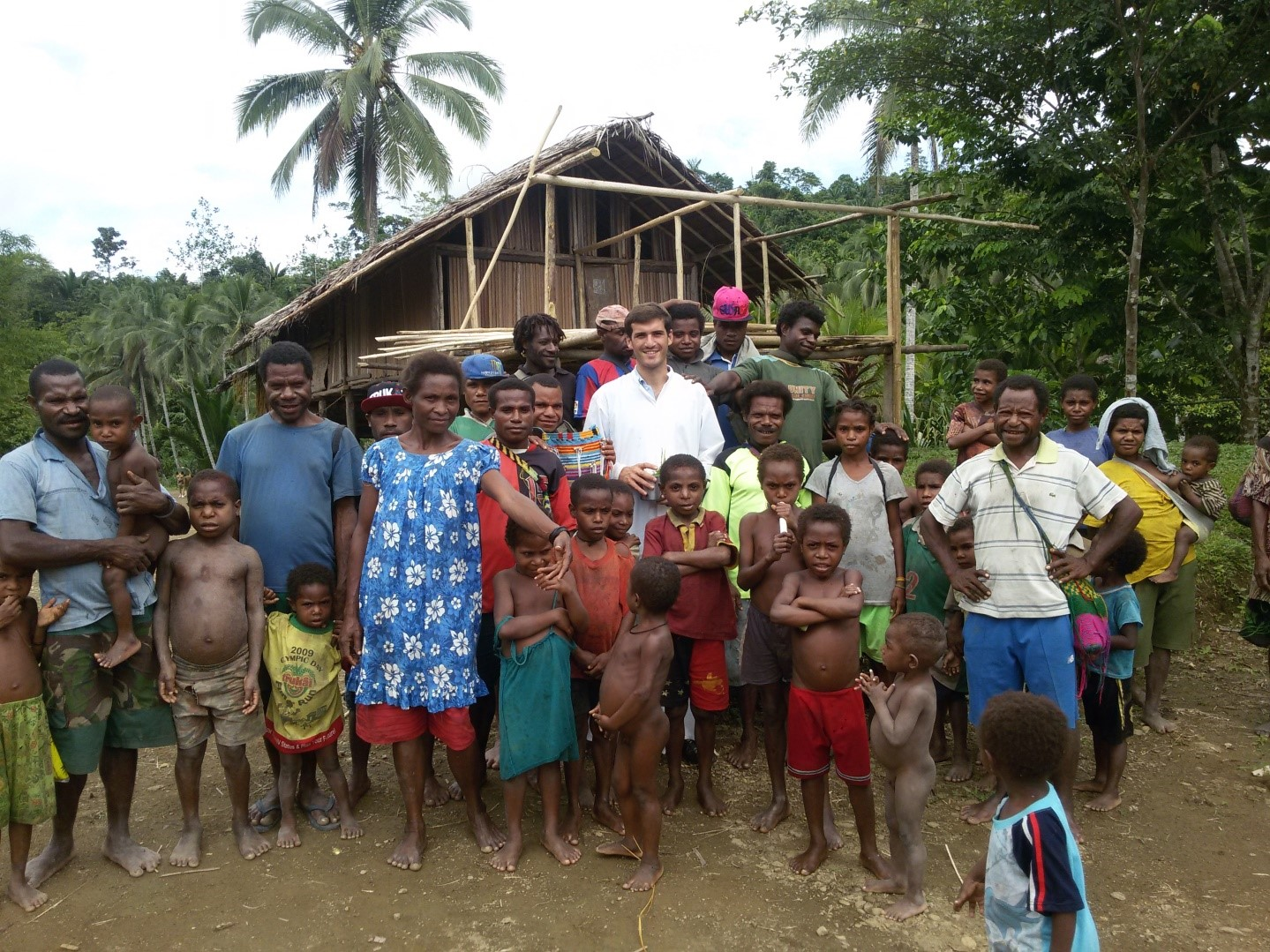
A priest of the Institute of the Incarnate Word makes a pastoral visit to a village in Papua New Guinea.

As members of the Institute are under the auspices of the local bishops, members of the Institute may assist them in the local Churches, providing formators for the seminaries, or accepting parochial and school assignments. Thus, in addition to managing houses of formation in Argentina, Brazil, Ecuador, Peru, Italy, Taiwan, the United States, and the Philippines, the Institute provides formators and professors for diocesan seminaries and universities in Italy, Peru, the Holy Land, Papua New Guinea, Kazakhstan, Ukraine, and the United States.

As of 2018 the congregation was divided into 14 Ecclesiastical Jurisdictions of the Roman Rite and various Eastern Rites. Each jurisdiction is under the governorship of a provincial superior; the Superior General of the institute is Fr. Gustavo J. Nieto, IVE.

== Religious Family of the Incarnate Word ==
=== Servants of the Lord and the Virgin of Matará ===
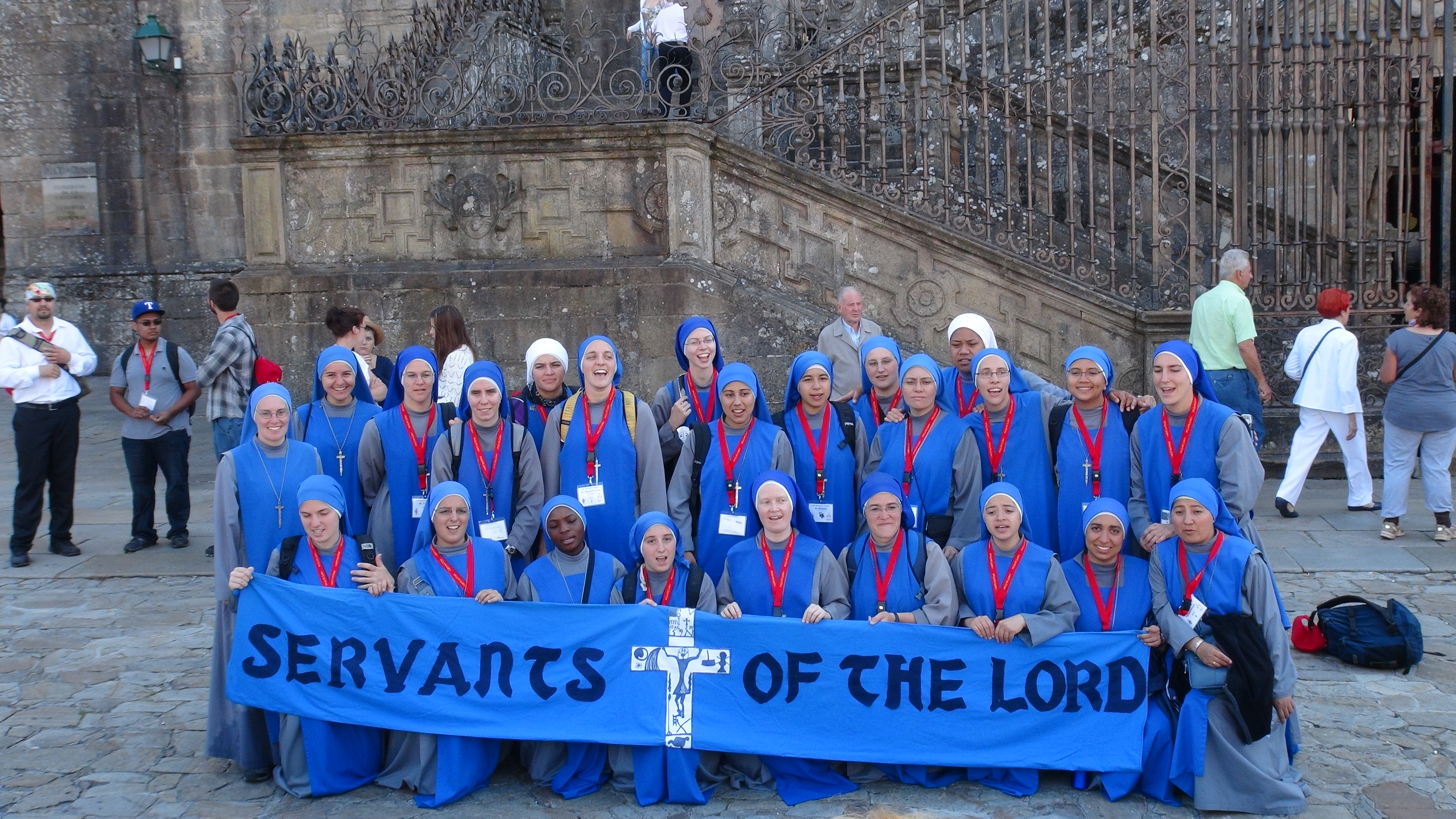
The SSVM in Santiago de Compostela.

Founded on March 19, 1988, by Buela, the Servants of the Lord and the Virgin of Matará (SSVM) is the female branch of the Religious Family of the Incarnate Word. Sharing the same founder, charisma and spirituality, they are canonically independent from the Institute of the Incarnate Word. As of 2018 there were approximately 1,000 members in 35 mission areas. They have their own houses of formation and a contemplative branch.

=== Third Order ===
The Secular Third Order or the lay order of the Family of the Incarnate Word is an association of lay faithful who live in the world while belonging to the religious family.

=== Contemplative Branch ===
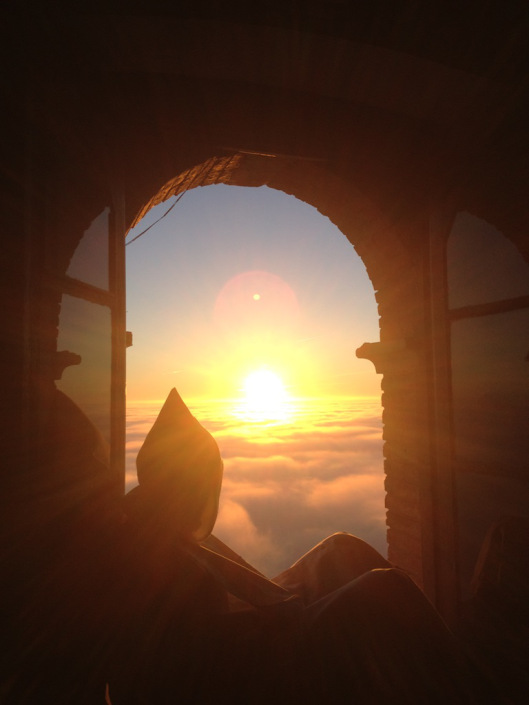
A contemplative monk of the Institute of the Incarnate Word at the Monastery of Our Lady of El Pueyo, Spain.

Buela founded the contemplative branch of the Institute of the Incarnate Word in December 1988. Ever since, the monks of the Institute have dedicated themselves to prayer, living in community under the same monastery roof and subjecting themselves to a rule and an abbot.

The monks live a fraternal life during times of recreation. As a sign of poverty they wear a simple monastic habit: white sackcloth, a cowl, a leather belt, and a white scapular onto which the shield of the institute is embroidered.

As of 2018 the institute has six monasteries, one each in Argentina, Italy, Israel, and Tunisia, and two in Spain.

=== Missionary Spirit ===
The Institute places a high priority on sending missionaries to places deemed to have a greater need, either because of a lack of missionaries or because the faithful are in urgent need of them. For example, since 2014, priests and religious of the Institute of the Incarnate Word and the Servants of the Lord and the Virgin of Matara have played important roles in caring for the displaced Christian refugees fleeing the threat of ISIS attacks in Baghdad and in Syria.

The institute also has an eastern branch in accord with John Paul II's call for the Church to breathe with "two lungs," Eastern and Western.

=== Patroness ===
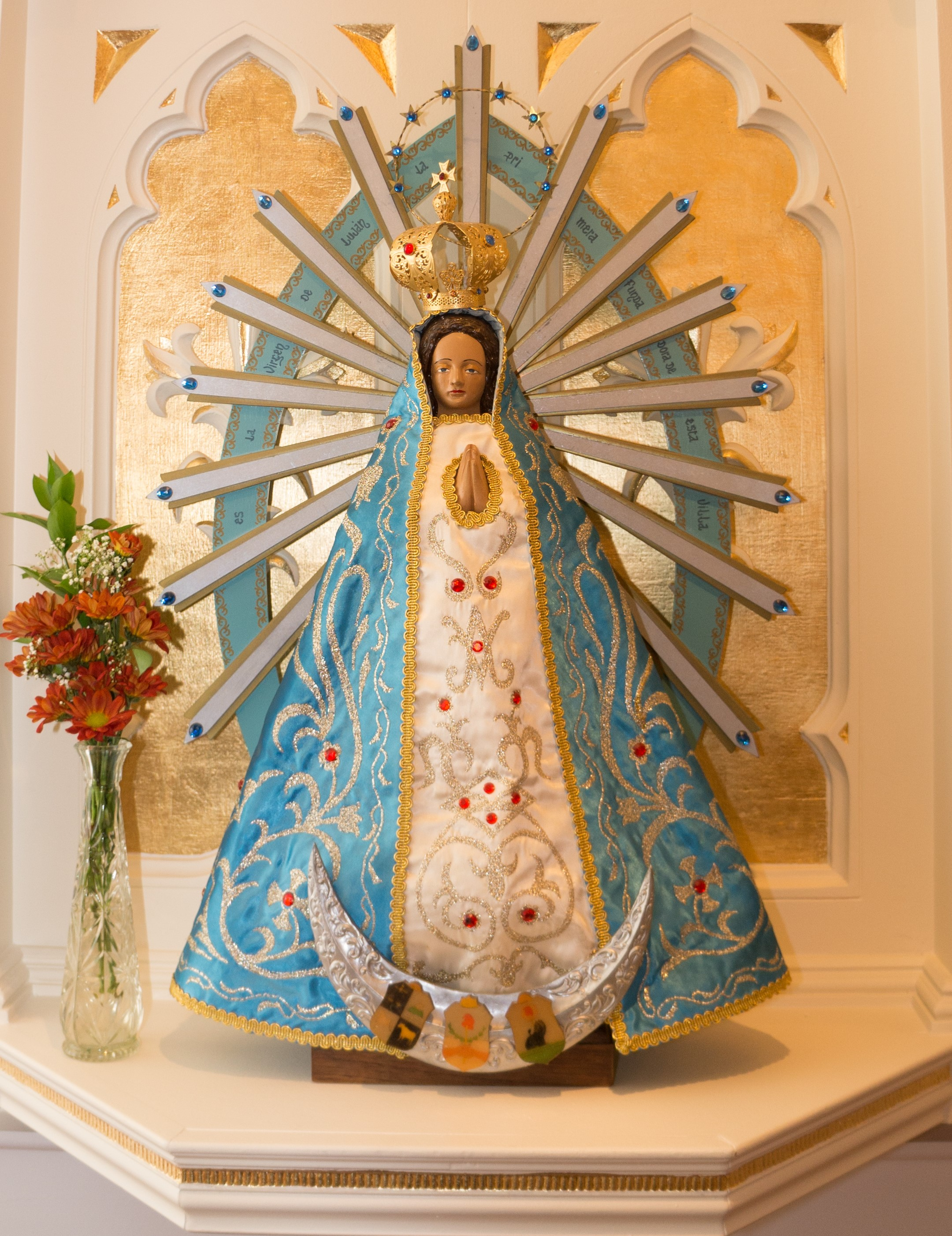
Image of Our Lady of Luján from the IVE seminary in Washington, DC.

Venerated as the beloved Patroness of Argentina, Our Lady of Luján is also considered the Patroness of the institute. Her image is on the walls of the rectories, convents, houses of formation, and all the other foundations common to the Religious Family.

As patroness of the missionaries of the Religious Family of the Incarnate Word, Our Lady of Luján continues to journey to foreign lands.

== Apostolates ==
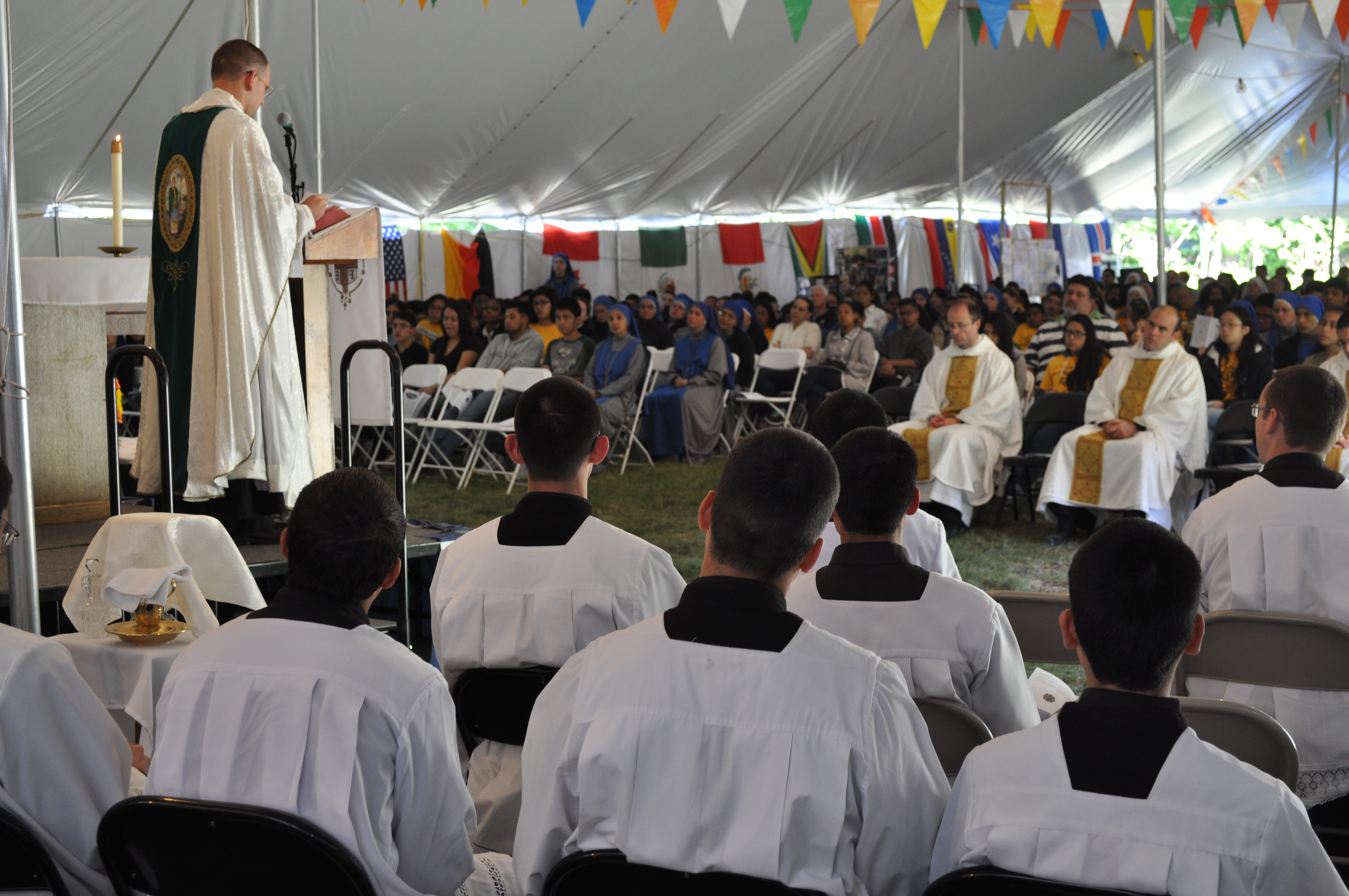
The Institute of the Incarnate Word annually hosts a weekend-long "Youth Festival" for high school aged youth at their retreat center in Upstate New York.

Members of the Institute devote themselves specially to preaching. They study scripture, theology, and in the liturgy; they teach it to youth; and they preach it in the forms of popular missions (intensive pastoral missions) and the Spiritual Exercises (retreats conducted according to the method of St. Ignatius of Loyola).

The institute is also involved in works of charity with those most in need abandoned children, the disabled, the sick, and the elderly—in various houses of charity throughout the world.

Members of the Institute publish articles in journals, periodicals, essays, books, etc.

== Government of the Institute ==
- Until 1994: Father Carlos Miguel Buela, IVE (Founder)
- 1994–2000: Father José Luis Solari, IVE (General Superior)
- 1995–1998: José Antonio Rico, OSB (Pontifical Delegate)
- 1998–1999: Aurelio Londoño, CM (Pontifical Delegate)
- 1999–2001: Alfonso Delgado Evers, OD, Bishop of Posadas (Pontifical Delegate)
- 2001–2010: Father Carlos Miguel Buela, IVE (2001.05.27 – 2010.01.22)
- 2010–2015: Father Carlos Walker, IVE (2010.07.15 – 2015.12.15)
- 2015–16: Angelo Todisco (Roman Rota) and Philippe Toxé, OP (Papal commissioners)
- 2016: Father Gustavo Nieto, IVE (2016.07.12 – ...)
