= Bundas =

Municipality of Angola

Coordinates: 14°06′44″S 21°26′07″E

The Municipality of Bundas lies at the south-eastern corner of Moxico Province of Angola near the border with Zambia. Its principal town is Lumbala. Due to the destruction of the Angolan Civil War, it is one of the most remote municipalities in Angola and access remains a large problem despite significant progress, as many roads are still not cleared of land mines and many bridges remain destroyed, but easily accessed by a tar road from Luena and a gravel road from the Zambian border to N'inda and a tar road to Lumbala N'guimbo.

Lumbala N'guimbo is the administrative centre and seat of the Bundas Municipality. The Bundas comprises seven communes: Lumbala N'guimbo (seat), Lutembo (76 km), Mussuma Mitete (80 km), N'inda (84 km), Sessa (80 km), Chiume (130 km), Luvuei (150 km), and covers an extension of 43,800 km^{2}.

The population is made up predominantly of the Mbunda people and former refugees who have returned to the area since the end of the Angolan Civil War. The estimated population of the whole Municipality before the war was 80,000. At the end of May 2006, the population was estimated to around 45,000 and at the 2014 census, the population has increased to 69,496. Most of the people fled to the neighbouring Zambia, but over the years thousands have returned. The average number of arrivals of spontaneous returnees highly increased. From October 2002 to 17 May 2006, 22,972 returnees registered in Lumbala N'guimbo.

The Municipality of Bundas now hosts the Mbunda Monarch King Mwene Mbandu III Mbandu Lifuti after restoration on 16 August 2008. It is under the traditional authority of a Mbunda Paramount Chief Mwene Ngimbu Vukolo, who ascribes to the Mbunda Monarch. The Mbunda prefer calling it Municipality of Lumbala N'guimbo.

The term "Bundas" is a Portuguese term referring to Mbunda.

== See also ==
- Mbunda language
- Mbunda people
- Bunda people
- Mbunda Kingdom
- List of The Rulers of the Mbunda Kingdom
- List of Mbunda Chiefs in Zambia
