= Tomboco =

- Municipality and town
- Location in Angola
- Coordinates: 6°48′S 13°18′E
- Country: Angola
- Province: Zaire Province

Population (2014 Census)
  - Municipality and town: 46,025
  - Urban: 20,358
- Time zone: UTC+1 (WAT)
- Climate: Aw

Tomboco is a town and municipality in Zaire Province in Angola. The municipality had a population of 46,025 in 2014.
