= Babaera =

- Municipality and town
- Location in Angola
- Coordinates: 12°12′S 15°27′E
- Country: Angola
- Province: Benguela Province
- Time zone: UTC+1 (WAT)
- Climate: Aw

Babaera is a commune in Benguela Province in Angola.
