= N'zeto =

Town in Zaire, Angola

N'Zeto
- Municipality and town
- Location in Angola
- Coordinates: 7°14′S 12°52′E
- Country: Angola
- Province: Zaire Province

Area
  - Total: 3,300 sq mi (8,550 km^{2})

Population (2014 census)
  - Total: 47,824
  - Density: 14.5/sq mi (5.59/km^{2})
- Time zone: UTC+1 (WAT)
- Climate: BSh

N'Zeto is a town, with a population of 28,840 (2014 census), and a municipality located in the province of Zaire in Angola. During the Portuguese domain the town was called Ambrizete. The municipality has an estimated population of 56,199 (2019). It is served by N'zeto Airport.
