= Muconda =

- Municipality and town
- Location in Angola
- Coordinates: 10°36′S 21°19′E
- Country: Angola
- Province: Lunda Sul Province

Population (2014 Census)
  - Municipality and town: 33,264
  - Urban: 8,000
- Time zone: UTC+1 (WAT)
- Climate: Aw

Muconda is a town and municipality in Lunda Sul Province in Angola. The municipality had a population of 33,264 in 2014.
