= Maianga (commune) =

- commune
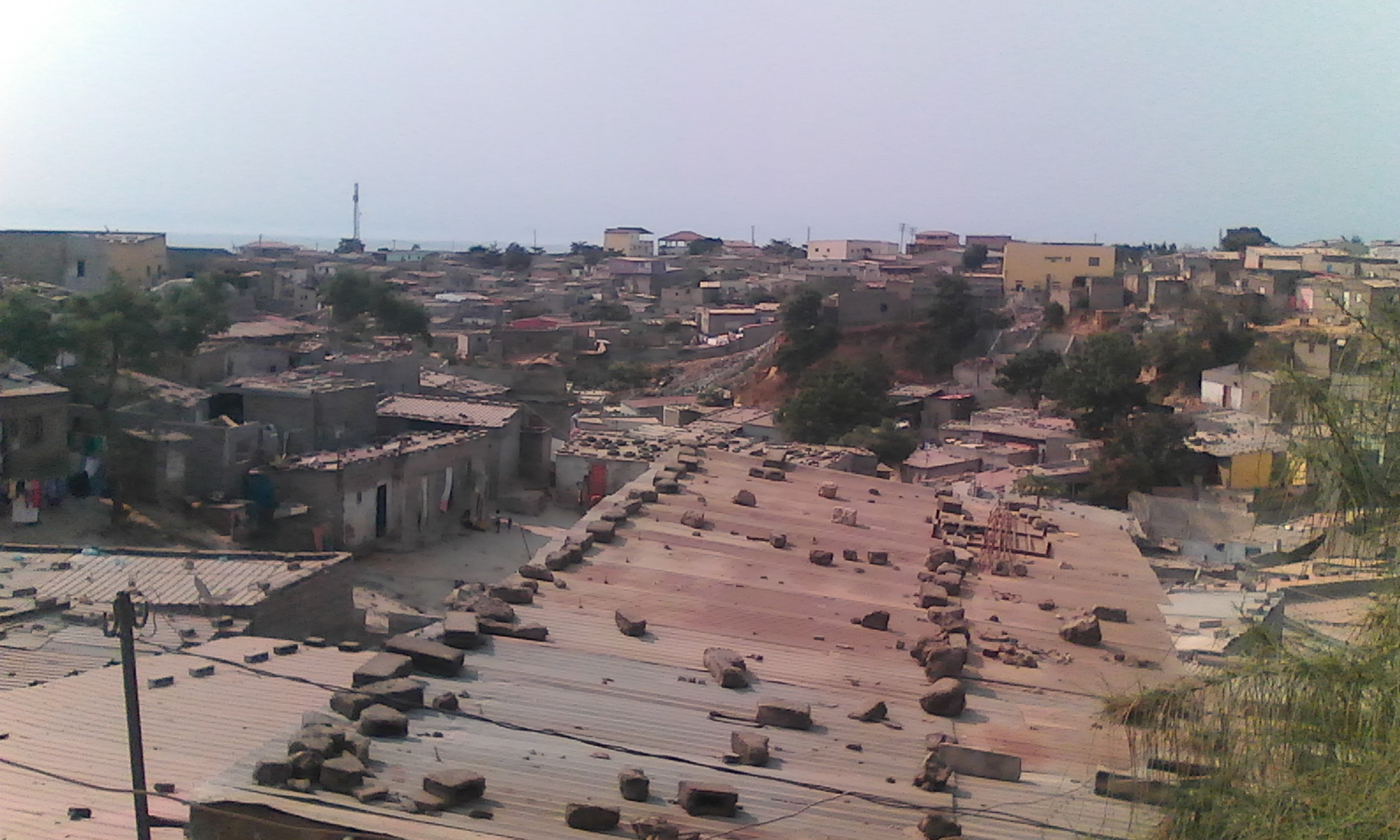

- Location in Angola
- Country: Angola
- Province: Luanda
- Time zone: UTC+1 (WAT)

Maianga (commune) is a town and commune of Angola, located in the province of Luanda.

== See also ==
- Communes of Angola
