= Lutuai =

- commune
- Location in Angola
- Coordinates: 12°39′35″S 20°07′46″E
- Country: Angola
- Province: Moxico
- Time zone: UTC+1 (WAT)

Lutuai is a town and commune of Angola, located in the province of Moxico.

== See also ==
- Communes of Angola
