= Noqui =

- Municipality and town
- Location in Angola
- Coordinates: 5°52′5″S 13°25′57″E
- Country: Angola
- Province: Zaire Province

Population (2014 Census)
  - Total: 23,880
- Time zone: UTC+1 (WAT)
- Climate: Aw

Noqui (or Noki) is a town and municipality in Zaire Province in Angola. It is on the Congo River, just across the border from the city of Matadi in the Democratic Republic of the Congo. The municipality had a population of 23,880 in 2014.

Noki was the site of an early European trading post. In 1884 Alexandre Delcommune was appointed director of the Belgian factories in Boma and Noki. In December 1884 Lieutenant Eduard Schulze tried to found a German colony near Noqui.
