= Calunda =

- commune
- Country: Angola
- Province: Moxico Leste
- Municipality: Macondo
- Time zone: UTC+1 (WAT)

Calunda is a town and commune of Angola, located in the province of Moxico Leste.
