= Candundo =

Nana Candundo
- commune
- Location in Angola
- Coordinates: 11°31′07″S 23°01′17″E
- Country: Angola
- Province: Moxico Leste
- Time zone: UTC+1 (WAT)

Nana Candundo is a town and commune of Angola, located in the province of Moxico Leste.

== See also ==
- Communes of Angola
