= Ucuma =

Ucuma (Portuguese) Ukuma (Imbundu)
- Municipality and town
- Location in Angola
- Coordinates: 12°51′S 15°04′E
- Country: Angola
- Province: Huambo
- Elevation: 1,400 m (4,600 ft)

Population (2014 Census)
  - Municipality and town: 55,054
  - Urban: 21,809
- Time zone: UTC+1 (WAT)
- Climate: Cwb

Ucuma is a town and municipality in Huambo Province, Angola. The municipality had a population of 55,054 in 2014.
