= Futungo de Belas =

Coordinates: 8°54′S 13°11′E

- commune
- Location in Angola
- Country: Angola
- Province: Luanda
- Municipality: Belas

Area
  - Total: 8.0 sq mi (20.7 km^{2})

Population (2014)
  - Total: 70,157
  - Density: 8,780/sq mi (3,390/km^{2})
- Time zone: UTC+1 (WAT)

Futungo de Belas is a commune located in Belas Municipality, the province of Luanda, in Angola.

== See also ==
- Communes of Angola
