= Kunjo =

Kunjo कुन्जो
- Village development committee
- Location in Nepal Kunjo (Nepal)
- Coordinates: 28.64°N 83.66°E
- Country: Nepal
- Zone: Dhawalagiri Zone
- District: Mustang District

Population (1991)
  - Total: 668
- Time zone: UTC+5:45 (Nepal Time)

Kunjo is a village development committee in Mustang District in the Dhawalagiri Zone of northern Nepal. At the time of the 2011 Nepal census it had a population of 711 people living in 174 individual households. The split per gender was approximately 52,6% male population and 47,4% female population.
