= Camanongue =

Town and municipality in Moxico Province, Angola

- Location within Angola
- Coordinates: 11.433°S 20.167°E
- Country: Angola
- Province: Moxico

Area
  - Total: 3,046 km^{2} (1,176 sq mi)

Population (2014)
  - Total: 12,930 (town); 34,167 (municipality)
  - Density: 4.245/km^{2} (10.99/sq mi)
- Time zone: UTC+1:00 (WAT)

Camanongue is a town, with a population of 12,930 (2014 census), and a municipality in the Moxico province in eastern Angola. The municipality has a population of 34,167 (2014 census) and a total area of 3,046 square kilometres (1,176 sq mi).
