= Carlos Miguel Buela =

Argentinian Catholic priest and abuser (1941–2023)

Father Carlos Miguel Buela IVE
- Superior General of the Institute of the Incarnate Word
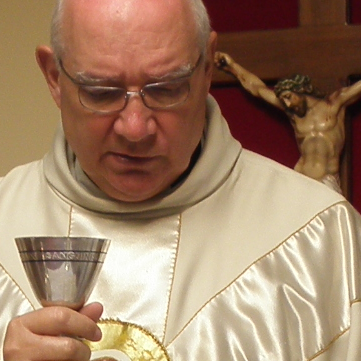
- Buela celebrating Mass
- Church: Latin Church
- In office: 1984–1994; 2001–2010

Orders
- Ordination: 7 October 1971

Personal details
- Born: 4 April 1941 Buenos Aires, Argentina
- Died: 23 April 2023 (aged 82) Genoa, Italy

Carlos Miguel Buela (4 April 1941 – 23 April 2023) was an Argentinian Catholic priest. In 1984, Buela founded the Institute of the Incarnate Word religious order, of which he was the Superior General from its founding until 1994 and again from 2001 until 2010, when he was removed as Superior General in response to allegations of abuse against seminarians. Both Pope Benedict XVI and Pope Francis confirmed the outcome, and in 2021 a Vatican tribunal found Buela guilty of committing sexual abuse against five members or former members of the order.

== Early life ==
Carlos Miguel Buela was born on 4 April 1941, in Buenos Aires, Argentina. He entered Inmaculada Concepción Seminary in Villa Devoto, Buenos Aires at the age of 23, and after finishing his studies at St. Charles Borromeo Seminary in Rosario was ordained a priest on 7 October 1971 for the Diocese of San Martín.

== Institute of the Incarnate Word ==
Buela founded the Institute of the Incarnate Word (IVE, Spanish: Instituto del Verbo Encarnado) in 1984 in the Diocese of San Rafael, Argentina, with the permission of Bishop León Kruk. It began as a public association of the faithful, made up of priests from the archdioceses of Buenos Aires and Paraná. However, eventually only Buela remained of the founding group. In 1988, Buela founded a female branch, the Servants of the Lord and of the Virgin of Matará. In addition to professing the evangelical counsels of poverty, chastity, and obedience, members of the IVE take a fourth vow of "Marian slavery".

The association conflicted with the bishops of the region, establishing itself in other dioceses without the permission of the local ordinaries. As a result, none of the bishops of San Rafael considered the group to have met the canonical conditions to become an Institute of Consecrated Life. In the late 1990s, the Episcopal Conference of Argentina petitioned to the Holy See to have the order suppressed on account of various alleged abuses. The Holy See did not suppress the order, and authorized ordinations of IVE seminarians; for a number of years, Argentinian bishops had refused to ordain members of the order. However, Buela was forced to resign as the superior in 1994 and leave the diocese of San Rafael. The order was allowed to establish itself in Italy, in the suburbicarian Diocese of Velletri–Segni. In 2001, Buela again became the Superior General.

== Sexual abuse allegations ==
In January 2010, the Congregation for Institutes of Consecrated Life and Societies of Apostolic Life issued a decree removing Buela as the Superior General of the Institute and requiring him to reside in a French abbey. After noticing an abnormal number of laicization requests from IVE priests, Eduardo Maria Taussig, bishop of San Rafael, had conducted an investigation, interviewing priests, former priests, and lay persons. Allegations emerged that Buela had engaged in inappropriate conduct against young members of the IVE, committing sexual abuse, abuse of power, and abuse of conscience. The Holy See reviewed the investigation and suspended Buela. Buela denied all claims and presented a 119-page defense document, alleging that the Episcopal Conference of Argentina was scheming against him to destabilize the IVE; however, the Holy See's investigation concluded that Buela's claims of a scheme were not credible, and that the allegations of abuse committed by Buela were credible. Both Pope Benedict XVI and Pope Francis recognized and confirmed the veracity of the allegations and outcome of the investigations. The priests, seminarians, and former seminarians who made accusations were all adults, and no complaints were ever filed in civil court.

In addition removing Buela as superior and instructing him on where to live, Buela was forbidden from contacting members of the congregation. Buela disobeyed the sanctions put against him several times, resulting in the Vatican issuing multiple additional decrees. In 2016, he was ordered to reside at a monastery in Spain. Later allegations emerged in 2015 of new allegations occurring after the 2010 decree, stating that Buela had ignored the 2010 decree restricting him from contact with IVE members and committed more abuse. A special tribunal led by Cardinal Santos Abril y Castelló concluded in 2021 that Buela had committed sins against the Sixth Commandment five members and former members of the IVE, using violence to do so. Buela appealed the decision. Abril stated in 2022 that there was a "lack of cooperation" on the part of the IVE, which he alleged had created a "shadow government" under the leadership of former superior general Fr. Gustavo Nieto.

== Death and legacy ==
Buela died on 23 April 2023 in Genoa, Italy. In September 2026 the Congregation for Institutes of Consecrated Life and Societies of Apostolic Life rejected his appeal of the 2021 decision and confirmed the verdict that he had committed several acts of sexual abuse and abuse of authority while in office.

The Institute of the Incarnate Word continues to speak laudably of Buela on various websites run by the Institute and its provinces; official biographies promote his life and writings, and leave out the allegations of abuse and canonical conviction. In 2022, the IVE America website stated that Buela "retired" in 2010, making no mention of the decree of removal. The Institute continues to sell Buela's writings, has released commemorative videos following his death, organizes pilgrimages to his tomb, and considers him to be "unjustly persecuted by the Holy See". In January 2025, the Dicastery for Institutes of Consecrated Life and Societies of Apostolic Life appointed pontifical delegates with full governing powers over the male and female branches of the IVE, citing "severe deficits" in the institutes regarding vocational discernment and formation.

== See also ==
- Marcial Maciel
