= Macondo, Moxico Leste =

Macondo (Moxico)
- Municipality
- Location in Angola
- Country: Angola
- Province: Moxico Leste
- Time zone: UTC+1 (WAT)

Macondo is a municipality of Angola, located in the province of Moxico Leste. It is subdivided into the communes of Macondo and Calunda.
