= Léua =

Municipality of Angola

Coordinates: 11°39′19″S 20°26′47″E

Léua is a city and municipality in Angola of the Moxico province. The municipal headquarters are 62 km east of the provincial capital, Luena. The municipality had a population of 32,457 in 2014.
