= Cangamba =

Coordinates: 13°41′S 19°52′E

- commune
- Location in Angola
- Country: Angola
- Province: Moxico Leste
- Time zone: UTC+1 (WAT)

Cangamba is a town and a municipality in Angola, located in the province of Moxico Leste, adjacent to the border with the Democratic Republic of the Congo.

== See also ==
- Communes of Angola
