= Dala, Angola =

Dala
- Municipality and town
- Location in Angola
- Coordinates: 11°2′3″S 20°12′13″E
- Country: Angola
- Province: Lunda Sul Province

Population (2014 Census)
  - Municipality and town: 29,991
  - Urban: 7,514
- Time zone: UTC+1 (WAT)
- Climate: Aw

Dala is a town and municipality in Lunda Sul Province in Angola. The municipality had a population of 29,991 in 2014.
