= Mussulo =

- Ilha do Mussulo
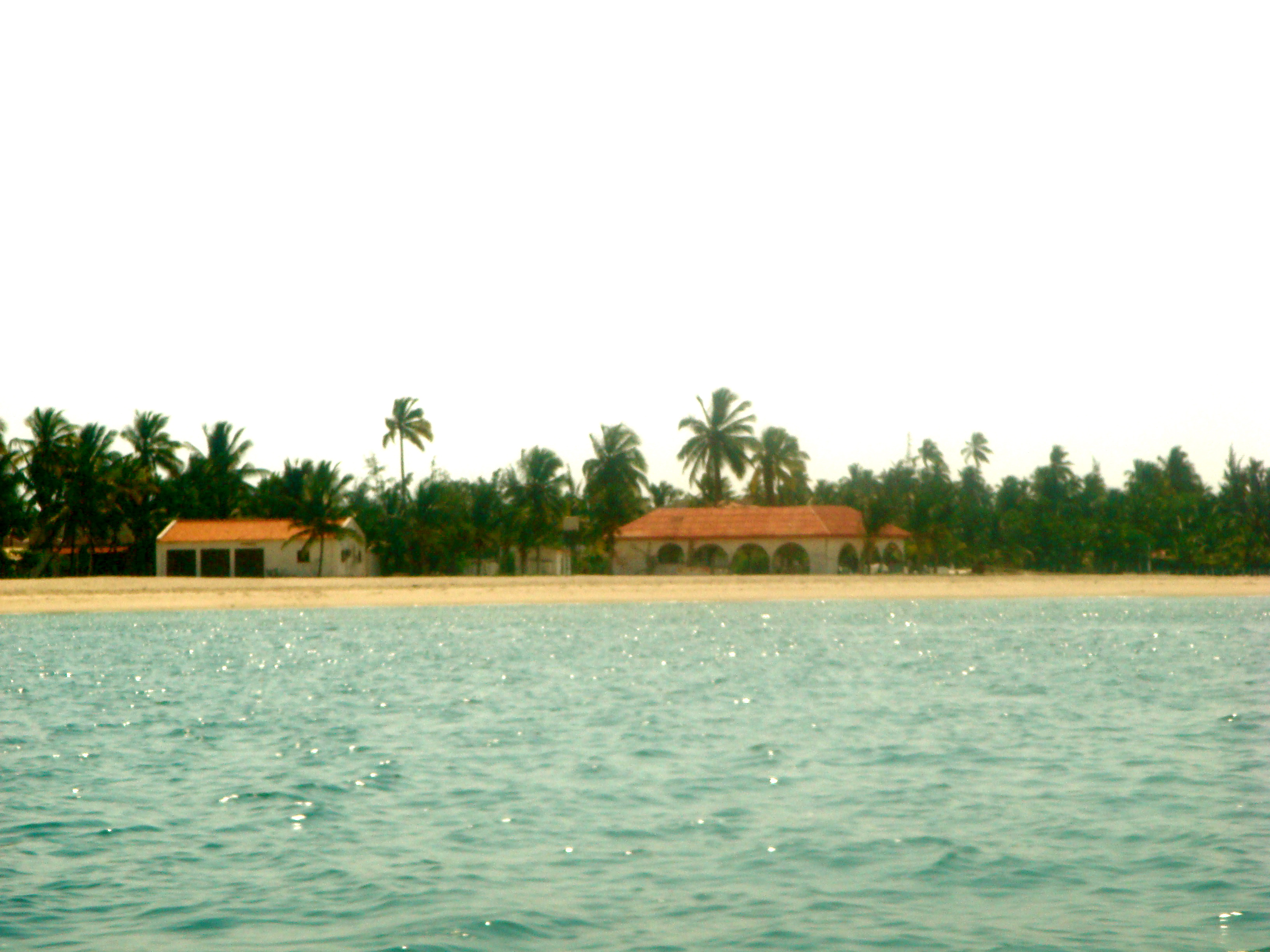
- Interactive map of Mussulo

Area
  - Total: 43.03 km^{2} (16.61 sq mi)

Population (2024 census)
  - Total: 15,283

Mussulo (Portuguese: Ilha do Mussulo) is a peninsula located in south of Luanda Province, Angola. It was part of the municipality of Mussulo, province of Luanda, but was later made a municipality. It is actually a spit created by sediments from the Cuanza River, moved north by the Benguela Current. It is about 30 km long, at most 3 km wide, and at the narrowest parts in the south of the peninsula, less than 100 metres.

Mussulo is linked to land at the Ponta das Palmeirinhas, the westernmost point of Luanda province.

The peninsula forms the Mussulo bay with three islands in it.

Mussulo is a favorite beach for Luandans with huts and restaurants at the bay beach facing the land. The outer beach to the Atlantic Ocean is hardly visited because of the strong sea current and high waves.

The Mussulo municipality had a population of 15,283 in 2024.
