= Cuimba =

- Municipality and town
- Location in Angola
- Coordinates: 6°7′4″S 14°37′2″E
- Country: Angola
- Province: Zaire Province

Area
  - Land: 744 sq mi (1,926 km^{2})

Population (2024 Census)
  - Total: 67,778
  - Density: 91.14/sq mi (35.19/km^{2})
- Time zone: UTC+1 (WAT)
- Climate: Aw

Cuimba is a town and municipality in Zaire Province in Angola. The municipality had a population of 67,778 in 2024.
