= Zaire Province =

Province of Angola

Coordinates: 6°16′S 14°14′E

Zaire Nzadi
- Province
- Zaire, province of Angola
- Country: Angola
- Capital: M'Banza Kongo

Government
  - Governor: Adriano Mendes de Carvalho
  - Vice-Governor for the Political, Economic and Social Sector: Afonso Nzolamesso
  - Vice-Governor for Technical Services and Infrastructures: Ângela Maria Botelho de Carvalho Diogo

Area
  - Total: 37,327 km^{2} (14,412 sq mi)

Population (2024)
  - Total: 682,648
  - Density: 18.288/km^{2} (47.367/sq mi)
- ISO 3166 code: AO-ZAI
- HDI (2018): 0.601 medium · 3rd
- Website: www.zaire.gov.ao

Zaire (Portuguese: Zaire, Kongo: Nzadi) is one of the 21 provinces of Angola. It occupies 40,130 square kilometres (15,490 mi^{2}) in the north west of the country and had a population of 594,428 inhabitants in 2014. It is bordered on the west by the Atlantic Ocean, on the north by the Democratic Republic of Congo, on the east by the Uíge Province, and on the south by the Bengo Province.

== History ==
The Kongo people (or Bakongo) occupied the valley of the Congo (or Zaire) River in the mid-thirteenth century, and formed the Kingdom of Kongo, which existed from 1390 until 1891 as an independent state, and until 1914 as a vassal state of the Kingdom of Portugal. In 1914, the Kongo monarchy was abolished after Portuguese suppression of several revolts. From 1885, Portuguese Angola included the District of Congo, which was split in 1919 into the districts of Cabinda and Zaire, respectively north and south of the Congo/Zaire River.

During the 1961–1974 Angolan War of Independence, a large fraction of the Bakongo fled to the Republic of Zaire. Many of these refugees and their offspring returned after the Alvor Agreement recognised Angolan independence.

== Monuments ==
A number of historical and cultural monuments are found in Zaire Province. They include Kulumbimbi Museum and the Ancient King's House in M'banza-Kongo. There's the Yala Nkuw (Tree of force or blood), a place where the king of Kongo executed verdicts. There are also the Ruins of the Cathedral, which was the first church of Angola, built in 1491. It was visited by Pope Pope John Paul II.

On the coast, there's the Rico and Pinda Ports, which served as ports for exportation of slaves. Finally, there's the Ponta do Padrão, the first port that served the Portuguese in 1482 for the discovery of Angola by Diogo Cão.

== Capital ==
M'Banza Congo (formerly São Salvador do Congo) is the provincial capital. The city is located around 481 kilometres (299 mi) of Luanda and 314 kilometres (195 mi) of Uíge.

== Municipalities ==
The province of Zaire contains six municipalities (Portuguese: municípios):

- Cuimba
- M'Banza Congo
- Nóqui
- N'zeto
- Soyo
- Tomboco

== Communes ==
The province of Zaire contains the following communes (Portuguese: comunas), sorted by their respective municipalities:

- Cuimba Municipality: – Buela, Cuimba, Luvaca, Serra da Canda (Kanda)
- M'Banza Congo Municipality: – Caluca, Kiende (Quiende), Luvu, Madimba, M'Banza Kongo, Nkalambata (Calambata)
- Nóqui Municipality: – Lufico, Mpala Lulendo, Nóqui
- N'Zeto Municipality: – Kindeji (Quindeje), Loge (Kibala Norte or Loge-Kibala, Mussera, N'Zeto
- Soyo Municipality: – Kelo (Quêlo), Mangue Grande, Pedra de Feitiço, Soyo, Sumba
- Tomboco Municipality: – Kiximba (Quinsimba), Kinzau (Quinzau), Tomboco

== Geography ==
Zaire Province has two seasons: from November to May, the rainy season; and from June to October, the dry season. The predominant types of weather in the province are tropical wet climate and semi-arid. The temperature in the area varies between 24 °C and 26 °C.

Fauna and Flora of the region are very varied, with savannah and dense rainforests. The main rivers of Zaire Province are: Congo, Mbridge, Lufunde, Zadi, Cuilo and Buenga.

== Demography ==
The national language spoken in the province is Kikongo and the predominant ethnic group in the region is Bakongo.

According to preliminary data from the General Census of Population and Housing conducted in May 2014, Zaire Province has currently 567,225 inhabitants, corresponding to 2.3 percent of the Angolan population. In this province, reside 285,333 women and 281,892 men, with 26.1% of the population living in rural areas and the majority, 73.9%, living in urban areas. The data also point to a population density of 15 inhabitants per square kilometre (39/sq mi).

== Politics ==
The Zaire Provincial Government consists of Governor José Joana André, and 3 Deputy Governors. Ângela Maria Botelho de Carvalho Diogo is the Deputy Governor for the area of Technical Services and Infrastructures; Alberto Maria Sabino is the Deputy Governor for the Economic Sector; and Rogério Eduardo Zabila is the Deputy Governor for Political and Social Sector.

== Industries ==
- Petroleum
- Mining: asphalt, iron, phosphates, lead, zinc
- Agriculture: cashew nuts, cassava, castor oil, citrus fruits, coffee, massambala, palm oil, pineapples, peanuts, rice, soybeans, sweet potatoes
- Cattle farming
- Fishing
- Production of construction materials
- Deposits: gold, silver, diamonds

== Transportation ==
=== Airports ===
Zaire Province is served by three airports. Soyo Airport and Mbanza Congo Airport have paved runways and regular flights to Luanda. N'zeto Airport has a grass strip runway and is used for private flights.

== Culture ==
The city celebrations take place on July 25 in M'Banza Congo, and on April 5 in Soyo.

Province typical dishes are sacafolha (made with cassava leaves), dishes made with fresh and dried fish accompanied by bombó funge, and dishes with game meat.

=== Tourism ===
Zaire Province has several natural points of interest, namely:

- The Spell Stone in Soyo.
- Musserra Bay, 56 kilometres (35 mi) from N'Zeto: used for bathing and water sports.
- Sirenes Beach in Soyo.
- Beach of the Poor, located in a prime area of Soyo city, on the left bank of the Zaire River.
- Congo River Mouth.
- Mbdrige River Falls in Soyo: used to canoeing and rafting.
- Pululu Channel in Kwanda.
- Kimbumba Channel, located 2 kilometres (1.2 mi) east of Soyo.
- Zau Evua Caves, 80 kilometres (50 mi) from M'Banza Congo.
- Senga Caves.

== List of governors of Zaire ==
Name	Years in office
Adolfo José Pedro	1976–1977
Gomes Almirante Dias	1977–1982
Jorge Barros Tchimpuati	1982–1984
Artur Vidal Gomes Kumbi Diezabo	1984–1987
Domingos Mutaleno	1987–1988
José Aníbal Lopes Rocha	1988–1991
Zeferino Estêvão Juliana	1991–1995
Ludy Kissassunda	1995–2004
Pedro Sebastião	2004–2012
José Joanes André	2012–2018
Pedro Makita Armando Júlia	2018–

From 1976 to 1991, the official name was Provincial Commissioner.
