= List of accidents and incidents involving the Boeing 727 =

Since the first flight of the prototype in February 1963, a total of 120 of the 1,832 Boeing 727s built have been lost due to crashes, terrorist acts and other causes as of March 2024.

== 1960s ==
- August 16, 1965: United Airlines Flight 389, a new 727-100, crashed into Lake Michigan 30 miles (26 nmi; 48 km) east northeast of Chicago's O'Hare Airport. The crew was told to descend to and maintain an altitude of 6,000 feet (1,800 m), which was the last radio communication with the flight. Civil Aeronautics Board (CAB, the primary air mishap investigation body in the United States at the time) investigators were not able to determine why the airliner continued its descent into the water. All 30 people on board were killed.
- November 8, 1965: American Airlines Flight 383, a 727-100, crashed on approach to the Greater Cincinnati Airport. Of the 62 people on board, only three passengers and one flight attendant survived. The investigation determined that the probable cause of the accident was the failure of the crew to properly monitor the altimeters during a visual approach into deteriorating visibility conditions.
- November 11, 1965: United Airlines Flight 227, a 727-100, departed LaGuardia Airport in New York City for a flight to San Francisco via Cleveland, Chicago, Denver, and Salt Lake City. Flight 227 crashed on landing at Salt Lake City International Airport, causing the deaths of 43 of the 91 people on board. The investigation determined that the cause of the accident was the captain's decision to approach the airport too steeply.
- February 4, 1966: All Nippon Airways Flight 60, a 727-100, was on approach to Tokyo's Haneda Airport at night when it crashed into the sea 6.5 miles (10.5 km) from the airport for reasons unknown, killing all 133 on board.
- November 15, 1966: Pan Am Flight 708, a 727-100, crashed near Dallgow, Germany (then East Germany) while on initial approach to Tegel Airport following an unexplained premature descent, killing the three crew.
- July 19, 1967: Piedmont Airlines Flight 22 collided with a twin-engine Cessna 310 shortly after departing Asheville Regional Airport in Asheville, North Carolina. All 79 passengers and crew on board the 727 and all three people in the Cessna died.
- November 12, 1967: An American Airlines 727-100 was flying over Alamosa, Colorado, when a bomb detonated in the rear baggage compartment, destroying three bags. The plane landed one hour and 45 minutes later. The FBI arrested the man responsible.
- February 16, 1968: Civil Air Transport Flight 010, a 727-100C, crashed on approach to Taipei, Republic of China. The flight carried 63 passengers and crew; 18 passengers, 3 crew and one person on the ground died.
- March 21, 1968: United Airlines Flight 9963, a 727-100QC operating on a cargo flight from O'Hare International Airport in Chicago to San Francisco, crashed shortly after takeoff; all three crew members survived.
- July 1, 1968: a hijacker on Northwest Airlines Flight 714 demanded to be taken to Cuba, landing at José Martí International Airport.
- July 4, 1968: TWA Flight 329 was hijacked out of Kansas City.
- September 22, 1968: Avianca Flight 101 was hijacked shortly after takeoff from Barranquilla. The hijacker demanded to be taken to Cuba, landing at Camaguey Airport.
- November 23, 1968: Eastern Air Lines Flight 73 was hijacked after taking off from Chicago-O'Hare, en route to Miami, Florida. The four hijackers demanded to be taken to Cuba, landing in Havana.
- January 5, 1969: Ariana Afghan Airlines Flight 701 crashed short of the runway near London Gatwick Airport; 48 passengers and crew and two people on the ground died.
- January 18, 1969: United Airlines Flight 266 crashed into Santa Monica Bay, California, after the pilots became disoriented following an unexplained electrical failure, killing all 38 on board. The crash led the FAA to require all transport aircraft to carry backup instruments powered by an alternate power source.
- April 8, 1969: LAN Chile Flight 160 crashed near Santiago, Chile, due to pilot error. There were no fatalities.
- June 4, 1969: Mexicana Flight 704 crashed near Salinas Victoria due to pilot error. All 72 passengers and seven crew members were killed.
- September 21, 1969: Mexicana Flight 801 crashed near Mexico City International Airport its during final approach, killing 27 of the 118 passengers and crew members on board.

== 1970s ==
- November 7, 1970: South African Airways Flight 307, a 727-100 (ZS-SBF), performed a landing at Cape Town International Airport with its nose landing gear retracted.
- December 28, 1970: Trans Caribbean Airways Flight 505 overran runway 09 at Harry S. Truman Airport on a flight from Isla Verde International Airport, killing 2 of the 55 people on board and injuring 51 of the 53 survivors
- July 30, 1971: All Nippon Airways Flight 58 collided with a Japan Air Self-Defense Force (JASDF) F-86F fighter jet, while en route from Chitose Airport to Haneda Airport in Tokyo, Japan. All 162 passengers and crew on board the 727 died, the fighter jet pilot survived. The crash of All Nippon Airways Flight 58 was the worst crash in aviation history at the time.
- September 4, 1971: Alaska Airlines Flight 1866, a 727-100, crashed into a mountain while on approach to Juneau, Alaska. A contributing cause involved the aircrew receiving erroneous navigational information for the approach. All seven crew members and 104 passengers died.
- November 24, 1971: Northwest Orient Airlines Flight 305 was hijacked by passenger D. B. Cooper while en route from Portland, Oregon to Seattle, Washington. After receiving a payment of $200,000 and four parachutes when he was in Seattle, he told the pilots to fly to Mexico, and jumped out of the aircraft from the aft airstair over Washington or Oregon. Cooper's fate is unknown. This incident led to the addition of a device named the "Cooper vane" on all 727s to prevent the airstair from being lowered while in flight. The 'Cooper' 727 continued in service until scrapped in the early 1990s in Missouri.
- May 5, 1972: Frederick Hahneman hijacked Eastern Air Lines Flight 175 en route from Allentown, Pa, to Miami, Fl. After receiving $303,000 and six parachutes he ordered the pilot to fly to Honduras, his birth country, where he jumped out and went on the run before finally surrendering.
- May 25, 1972: an hour after a LAN Chile took off from Panama City, a pipe bomb detonated in the ice water fountain service compartment, causing a rapid decompression. The pilots managed to land safely in Montego Bay, Jamaica.
- August 16, 1972: During an attempted coup d'état, jets from the Royal Moroccan Air Force fired upon the 727 transporting King Hassan II of Morocco while he was traveling to Rabat. After the aircraft survived the attack, the king awarded it a medal of honor.
- February 21, 1973: Libyan Arab Airlines Flight 114, a 727-200 flying over the Sinai Desert was fired upon by Israeli air force aircraft as it was suspected of being an enemy military aircraft. Of 113 people on board, 108 died.
- September 15, 1974: Air Vietnam Flight 706 was hijacked by a former South Vietnamese army officer who ordered that it be flown to Hanoi. The pilots attempted to land at Phan Rang Air Base, but the aircraft crashed just short of it for unknown reasons. It was thought that the hijacker exploded grenades in the cockpit after the crew refused to comply with his demands. All 75 persons aboard died.
- December 1, 1974: TWA Flight 514, a 727-200 (registration N54328), crashed on Mount Weather while flying from Indianapolis, and Columbus, Ohio, to Washington Dulles International Airport in turbulent weather. All 85 passengers and seven crew members on board died.
- December 1, 1974: Northwest Airlines Flight 6231 crashed due to icing near Stony Point, New York. All three crew members died.
- June 24, 1975: Eastern Air Lines Flight 66 crashed on approach to John F. Kennedy International Airport; 113 people died. The cause was determined to be a microburst.
- November 12, 1975: Eastern Air Lines Flight 576 a 727-225, (registration N8838E) struck the ground about 282 feet short of runway 23 at the Raleigh-Durham International Airport, North Carolina, bounced and touched down on the runway, then slid to a stop off the right side of the runway 4,150 feet past the runway threshold. The accident occurred during an instrument landing system approach when the airplane encountered unexpectedly heavy rain while 100 feet above the ground. The airplane was damaged substantially from the first ground contact, both main landing gears and the No. 3 engine separated from the aircraft. The aircraft was repaired and returned to service.. Of the 139 persons aboard the airplane eight people were injured, one injured seriously; there were no fatalities.
- April 5, 1976: Alaska Airlines Flight 60 crashed on landing at Ketchikan International Airport after the aircraft overran the runway due to pilot error. One of the 50 people on board were killed.
- April 27, 1976: American Airlines Flight 625 crashed in St. Thomas, Virgin Islands, due to pilot error while trying to land on a notoriously tricky runway. 37 of the 88 people on board were killed.
- 10 September 1976: TWA Flight 355 was hijacked by five members of the "Fighters for Free Croatia" group and ultimately flown to Paris.
- 19 September 1976: Turkish Airlines Flight 452, a 727-200 (registration TC-JBH, named Antalya) on a domestic flight from Istanbul Yeşilköy Airport (IST/LTBA) to Antalya Airport (AYT/LTAI) struck high ground in the Karatepe Mountains during an attempted landing in Isparta instead of Antalya by pilot error. All eight crew and 146 passengers on board died.
- November 19, 1977: TAP Portugal Flight 425 overran the runway at Madeira Airport and plunged over a steep bank, bursting into flames; 131 of the 164 people on board died.
- May 8, 1978: National Airlines Flight 193 landed short of the runway at Pensacola Regional Airport coming down in Escambia Bay instead; three of the 58 passengers and crew on board died.
- September 25, 1978: Pacific Southwest Airlines Flight 182 crashed after colliding with a Cessna 172 aircraft in San Diego, killing all 137 people on board the 727 plus two on the Cessna and a further 7 on the ground for a total of 144 deaths.
- March 14, 1979: Alia Royal Jordanian Flight 600, a 727-200, crashed at Doha Airport in Qatar after an approach during a thunderstorm; 45 of the 64 passengers on board died.
- April 4, 1979: TWA Flight 841 went into a spiral dive over Saginaw, Michigan, after a slat failed to retract. The aircraft landed safely at Detroit with no loss of life. The pilots blamed the incident on mechanical failure, but the NTSB blamed the pilots.
- June 20, 1979: American Airlines Flight 293 was hijacked by Serbian nationalist and anti-communist Nikola Kavaja and flown back to New York City where he demanded and received a Boeing 707 to fly to South Africa but flew to Ireland instead. Kavaja planned to crash the 707 into the headquarters of the Yugoslav Communist Party, but he surrendered to Irish authorities who then turned him over to American authorities.
- November 15, 1979: American Airlines Flight 444 experienced an attempted bombing by the Unabomber. Although the bomb didn't detonate, it let off smoke. The pilots made an emergency landing at Dulles International Airport. Twelve passengers were treated for smoke inhalation. Ted Kaczynski was arrested in 1996.

== 1980s ==
- January 21, 1980: Iran Air Flight 291 crashed near Tehran, Iran; all 128 on board died.
- April 12, 1980: Transbrasil Flight 303, a 727-100C, crashed in Florianópolis, Brazil. 55 of the 58 people aboard died.
- April 25, 1980: Dan-Air Flight 1008, a 727-100 crashed in Tenerife. All 146 passengers and crew on board died when the aircraft hit terrain while circling.
- November 21, 1980: Continental Micronesia Flight 614, a 727-92C crashed while attempted to land at Yap International Airport. All 67 passengers and six crew survived.
- June 8, 1982: VASP Flight 168, 727-200 registration PP-SRK from Rio de Janeiro-Galeão to Fortaleza collided with a mountain while on approach to Fortaleza. The captain descended below a minimum descent altitude. All 137 passengers and crew died.
- July 9, 1982: Pan Am Flight 759 crashed due to a microburst shortly after take-off from New Orleans International Airport. All 145 on board the 727 as well as eight people on the ground were killed.
- January 16, 1983: Turkish Airlines Flight 158, crashed short of the runway at Esenboğa International Airport. 47 of the 67 passengers and crew on board died.
- December 7, 1983: the Madrid runway disaster took place where a departing Iberia 727 struck an Aviaco Douglas DC-9 causing the death of 93 passengers and crew. 51 of the 93 passengers on board the 727 died.
- January 1, 1985: Eastern Air Lines Flight 980 crashed into Mount Illimani at an altitude of 19,600 feet. All 29 crew and passengers on board died. The flight was flying from Silvio Pettirossi International Airport and destined for El Alto International Airport.
- January 23, 1985: a passenger detonated a bomb in a lavatory on board a Lloyd Aéreo Boliviano flight from La Paz to Santa Cruz de la Sierra, killing him. The aircraft involved, a Boeing 727-200 registered CP-1276, was substantially damaged but could safely be landed. There were no fatalities among the other 119 passengers and seven crew members.
- February 19, 1985: Iberia Airlines Flight 610 crashed after striking a television antenna while landing in Bilbao; all 148 people on board died. Flight 610 originated from Madrid-Barajas Airport.
- June 12, 1985: Alia Royal Jordanian Airlines Flight 402, a 727-200 (registration JY-AFW) operated on a flight from Beirut, Lebanon to Amman, Jordan. Shortly before takeoff, five Shiite Arab men armed with automatic weapons and explosives, hijacked the airplane. They demanded to be flown to Tunis, Tunisia. Due to fuel shortage, the flight was diverted to Larnaca, Cyprus. Permission to land at Tunis was refused, so the flight diverted to Palermo. After refueling there, the aircraft was flown back to Beirut. All occupants (three pilots, six flight attendants, eight sky marshals and about 65 passengers) were released and the plane was blown up using explosives.
- June 14, 1985: TWA Flight 847, a 727-200 (registration N64339) operated a flight from Cairo to San Diego with en route stops in Athens, Rome, Boston, and Los Angeles was hijacked by members of Hezbollah and Islamic Jihad shortly after takeoff from Athens. The hijackers were seeking the release of 700 Shi'ite Muslims from Israeli custody. The passengers and crew endured a three-day intercontinental ordeal. Some passengers were threatened and some beaten. Passengers with Jewish-sounding names were moved apart from the others. United States Navy diver Robert Stethem was killed, and his body was thrown onto the tarmac. Dozens of passengers were held hostage over the next two weeks until released by their captors after some of their demands were met.
- March 31, 1986: Mexicana Flight 940, a 727-200 (registration XA-MEM) crashed near Maravatío in the Mexican state of Michoacán. Shortly after takeoff and climbing to 29,000 feet (8,800 m), an overheated tire exploded in the right main wheel well, tearing through fuel lines and damaging the hydraulic and electrical systems. The resulting fire eventually rendered the aircraft uncontrollable. All 167 people (eight crew and 159 passengers) on board were killed.
- April 2, 1986: TWA Flight 840 was descending for landing when a bomb exploded, ejecting four passengers to their deaths. The plane landed safely at Athens International Airport. The Abu Nidal Organisation was responsible.
- February 27, 1988: a Talia Airways Flight 2H79 727-2H9 registration TC-AKD had been cleared for a VOR approach, but cancelled IFR and descended to 2000 feet, disregarding the altitude of the mountain chain ahead (3130 feet). Noticing mountains ahead the pilot tried to turn left and climb, but struck the Girne Arap mountain in Cyprus. All nine passengers and six crew members were killed.
- March 17, 1988: Avianca Flight 410, a domestic flight, crashed into low mountains near Cúcuta – Norte de Santander, Colombia, after take-off; all 143 on board died. It was determined that pilot error was also the cause of this crash, in a situation similar to that of Avianca Flight 011, five years earlier.
- May 23, 1988: LACSA Flight 628, a 727-22 (registration TI-LRC) aborted takeoff after V1 because the aircraft could not rotate. The aircraft overran runway 07, collided with a fence, crossed a ditch, struck a hill and caught fire at Juan Santamaría International Airport in San José, Costa Rica. There were no fatalities.
- August 31, 1988: Delta Air Lines Flight 1141, a 727-232 (N473DA) crashed on takeoff from Dallas–Fort Worth; 14 of the 108 passengers and crew on board died, 76 others were injured. Investigators found that the plane had taken off without the wing flaps and slats properly configured.
- January 31, 1989: ACES Colombia Flight 385 was hijacked after taking off from Gustavo Rojas Pinilla International Airport in San Andrés Island. The crew managed to land in Costa Rica where the hijacker was arrested.
- October 14, 1989: Delta Air Lines Flight 1554, a 727-232, preparing for a flight to Edmonton International Airport caught fire while at the gate at Salt Lake City International Airport due to a faulty oxygen generator control unit. Smoke filled the cabin, but all 22 passengers and crew evacuated with just five minor injuries. The aircraft was destroyed by the fire.
- October 21, 1989: Tan-Sahsa Flight 414 a 727-200 (N88705) operated as TAN, crashed in the Cerro de Hula mountains after an unsuccessful approach method, killing 131 of 138 passengers and crew.
- November 27, 1989: Avianca Flight 203 crashed after a bomb exploded on board. All 107 passengers and crew members on board plus 3 people on ground died.

== 1990s ==
- January 4, 1990: Northwest Airlines Flight 5 lost an engine over Madison, Florida; the aircraft landed safely at Tampa with no casualties to the 145 on board.
- September 11, 1990: A Faucett Perú 727-247 registration OB-1303 disappeared off the coast of Newfoundland during a ferry flight with 16 people on board. The crew last made a distress call stating they were low on fuel and preparing to ditch.
- December 3, 1990: Northwest Airlines Flight 299 collided on the runway with Northwest Airlines Flight 1482, a DC-9, at Wayne County Airport after the DC-9 mistakenly taxied onto an active runway; eight of 44 on board Flight 1482 died while all 154 on board Flight 299 survived.
- November 10, 1991: An Aeronica 727-25 registration YN-BXW was damaged beyond economic repair at Managua Airport in Nicaragua, due to the ignition of leaking high-pressure oxygen during replenishment of oxygen supplies. There were no fatalities.
- February 11, 1992: A Tunisair 727-2H3 registration TS-JHV was damaged beyond economic repair. The engines were started for an engine-run at Tunis-Carthage Airport in Tunisia. When engine power reached 80%, the aircraft ran over its blocks and ran into a hangar. There were no fatalities.
- December 22, 1992: Libyan Arab Airlines Flight 1103, a 727-2L5 (registration 5A-DIA) was involved in a mid-air collision with a Mikoyan-Gurevich MiG-23 of Libyan Air Force over Tripoli, Libya. The crash resulted in the deaths of 147 passengers and 10 crew members on board the 727, the two MiG pilots survived.
- May 19, 1993: SAM Colombia Flight 501, en route from Panama City, Panama, to Medellín, Colombia, hit Mt. Paramo de Frontino at 12,300 ft on approach to José María Córdova International Airport (SKRG). All 132 passengers and crew died.
- April 27, 1994: A Transafrik 727-100F registration S9-TAN from Quatro de Fevereiro Airport in Luanda, Angola and touched down 2 metres (6.6 ft) short of the runway at the Mbanza Airport in M'banza-Kongo, Angola. The undercarriage struck a drainage ditch and collapsed. The aircraft continued onto the runway, veered right off the side of the runway and crossed a road, striking a bus with its right wing. All seven occupants on the bus were killed and all three crew members on the aircraft survived.
- January 31, 1995: An Angola Air Charter 727-100F registration D2-TJB touched down 500m beyond the runway threshold at Huambo Airport in Huambo, Angola. Due to heavy rainfall the aircraft aquaplaned off the runway 11/29 and became stuck in the mud; the landing gear was torn off. All three crew members survived.
- November 7, 1996: ADC Airlines Flight 86, a 727-200, crashed near Ejirin, Nigeria when the pilots lost control after taking evasive action to avoid a midair collision. 144 people died in the crash.
- August 12, 1997: Olympic Airways 727-230 registration SX-CBI, operated domestic flight 171 from Athens to Thessaloniki, in Greece. Due to pressure from a thunderstorm at the destination and bad crew communication, the aircraft touched down past the first third of the runway, could not stop in the remaining runway, and was steered to the right when an overrun into the sea was imminent. The aircraft was damaged beyond repair, but there were no fatalities.
- February 9, 1998: An American Airlines 727-200 (N845AA), crashed short of the runway at Chicago-O'Hare International Airport. All 121 persons on board survived but the aircraft was written off.
- March 19, 1998: An Ariana Afghan Airlines 727-200 struck Sharki Baratayi mountain in poor weather while descending for Kabul, killing all 45 on board.
- April 20, 1998 Air France Flight 422 crashed into terrain due to pilot error after taking off from Bogotá, Colombia. All 53 passengers and crew were killed in the accident.
- October 10, 1998: A Lignes Aeriennes Congolaises 727-100 (9Q-CSG) was shot down by rebels with a SA-7 (Strela 2) missile and crashed near Kindu Airport while attempting to return following the attack, killing all 41 on board.
- 31 January 1999: An Air Algérie 727-200 registration 7T-VEH ran off the runway and struck a mound of snow on landing at Constantine-Ain el Bey Airport in Algeria. Nose-gear collapsed. A total of 92 passengers and seven crew members survived, but the aircraft was written off.
- July 7, 1999: a Hinduja Cargo Services 727-243F (registration VT-LCI), operating as Lufthansa Cargo Flight 8533, crashed into terrain six nautical miles from Kathmandu, Nepal. All five crew including 2 mechanics died in the accident. The accident occurred due to pilot error combined with ATC error.

== 2000s ==
- March 19, 2000: An Aviandina Boeing 727-100 (reg. OB-1731) on a scheduled passenger flight from Arequipa to Juliaca, Peru, deviated to Tacna Airport after suffering an in-flight landing gear failure that forced the crew to divert to Tacna, where the plane landed with its right main landing gear retracted after the pilots flew for over an hour on a holding pattern to burn most of the aircraft's fuel before the emergency landing.
- January 28, 2002: TAME Flight 120, a 727-100 from Mariscal Sucre Airport in Quito, Ecuador, stalled and crashed into the side of Cumbal Volcano, 27 km (16.9 mi) north-west of Ipiales, Colombia. All 87 passengers and 7 crew on board were killed.
- March 18, 2002: A Varig 727-100 freighter, registration PP-VLV, operating Flight 9051 from Salvador, ran off the side of the runway when landing at Tancredo Neves International Airport near Belo Horizonte, Brazil. Damage was sustained to the left main landing gear, nose landing gear, forward fuselage belly, left engine, and left wing and flaps. All three crew members on board survived.
- July 26, 2002: FedEx Express Flight 1478, a 727-200F (registration N497FE) had initially briefed the approach to runway 27 of Tallahassee Municipal Airport near Tallahassee, Florida. The plane crashed, all three crew members survived.
- May 25, 2003: A 727-200, registration number N844AA, was stolen from Quatro de Fevereiro Airport in Luanda, Angola. The aircraft has not been seen since it took off.
- December 25, 2003: Union des Transports Africains de Guinée Flight 141, a 727-223 on a charter flight, overran the runway at Cotonou Cadjehoun Airport into the sea. Of the 160 passengers on board, 141 died. A French BEA investigation attributed the cause of the crash to overloading of passengers and cargo leading to out-of-limits center of gravity.
- October 31, 2005: An MIBA Aviation 727-22F registration 9Q-CPJ, operating a cargo flight transported seven tons of materials on behalf of Conader (Commission Nationale de Démobilisation et Réinsertion). The aircraft skidded off the wet runway on landing at Kindu Airport in Kindu, Democratic Republic of the Congo, ending up in marshy terrain. All seven occupants survived.
- November 18, 2006: An Aerosucre 727-23F registration HK-3667X, operating a cargo flight from Bogotá to Leticia (both in Colombia), was cleared for a visual approach to runway 21 at Leticia (LET). On finals the cargo plane entered a fog bank plane. It hit a 150-feet high antenna and crashed near the village of San Sebastián de los Lagos. All six crew members and passengers were killed.
- January 25, 2008: a parked Boeing 727-247 Advanced (registration 9L-LEF), operated by Canadian Airways Congo, was hit by a taxiing Antonov An-12BP (registration EK-11660) of Aéro-Service at Pointe Noire Airport in Pointe-Noire, Republic of the Congo after the An-12's brakes failed. There were no fatalities but both aircraft were damaged beyond economic repair.
- February 1, 2008: Lloyd Aéreo Boliviano Flight 301, a Boeing 727-259 (registration CP-2429) landed 4.2 km short of the runway of Teniente Jorge Henrich Arauz Airport, in Trinidad, Bolivia, after deviating from Captain Aníbal Arab Airport, in Cobija, Pando, due to adverse weather conditions. The plane ran out of fuel; no fatalities; aircraft damaged beyond repair.

== 2010s ==
- January 9, 2011: Iran Air Flight 277, a 727-286 Advanced, crashed shortly before landing, at Urmia, Iran. Of the 105 passengers and crew on board, 78 were killed.
- July 8, 2011: Hewa Bora Airways Flight 952, a 727-22WL, registration 9Q-COP crashed while trying to land at Bangoka International Airport in the Democratic Republic of the Congo during bad weather. A total of 77 were killed.
- October 18, 2011: Iran Air Flight 742 landed at Mehrabad with the nosegear retracted after it failed to come down; all 113 on board survived.
- June 2, 2012: Allied Air Flight 111, a 727-221F (registration 5N-BJN), overshot the runway while landing in a heavy thunderstorm at Kotoka International Airport in Accra, Ghana after flying from Lagos, Nigeria. The aircraft continued through the airport boundary fence and across a main road, hitting a minivan. 10 people in the minivan died along with a cyclist and passenger in taxi. The four crew members suffered minor injuries.
- December 20, 2016: Aerosucre Flight 157 crashed soon after taking off from Germán Olano Airport, in Puerto Carreño, Colombia. The aircraft overran the runway, broke through the airport perimeter fences, and barely became airborne. It lost height again about three minutes later, impacted the ground about 10 miles from the airport, disintegrated, and burst into flames. Colombia's Aerocivil reported that five of the six crew members died.

== 2020s ==
- March 31, 2024: A Safe Air Company Boeing 727-2Q9 (registration 5Y-IRE), crashed and broke up on impact while landing at Malakal Airport, South Sudan. The aircraft collided with an MD-82 that had been parked at the airport after suffering an accident in February of that same year.

== See also ==
- 2012 Boeing 727 crash experiment, the deliberate crash of a Boeing 727 in Mexico for the Discovery Channel television show Curiosity.
