= Transafrik International Flight 806 =

1998 aircraft shootdown in Angola

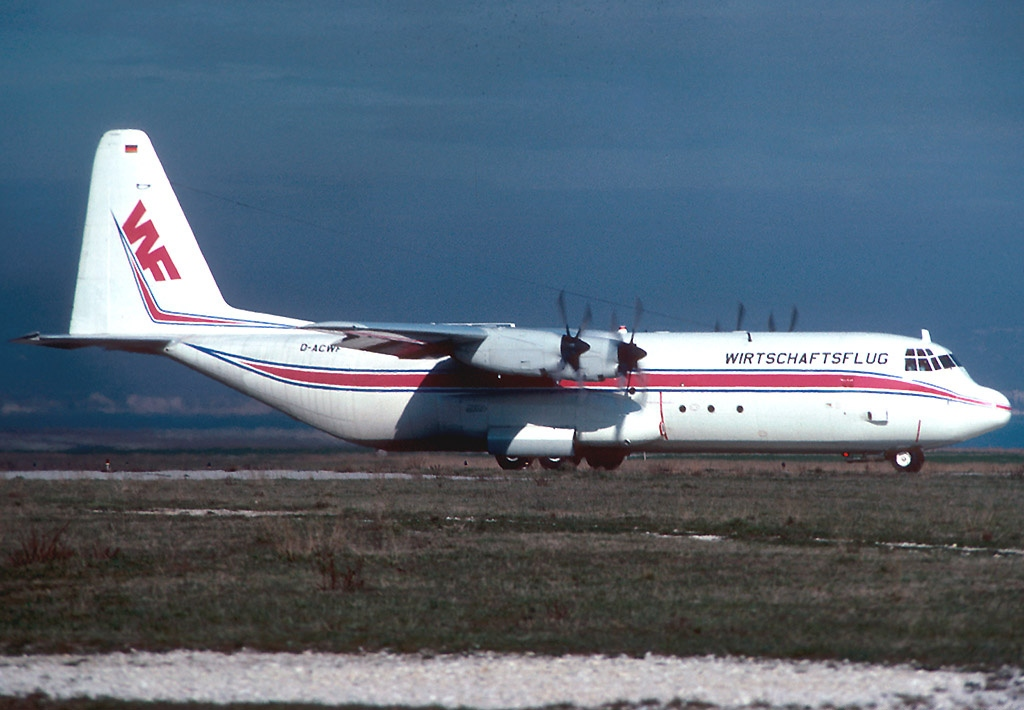
- A Lockheed L-100-30 Hercules, similar to the aircraft involved

Shootdown
- Date: 26 December 1998
- Summary: Shot down by a surface-to-air missile
- Site: Chicala-Choloanga, Huambo Province, Angola; 12°38′53″S 16°02′17.3″E

Aircraft
- Aircraft type: Lockheed L-100-30 Hercules
- Operator: Transafrik International, for the United Nations
- ICAO flight No.: UNO806
- Call sign: UNITED NATIONS 806
- Registration: S9-CAO
- Flight origin: Huambo Airport, Huambo Province, Angola
- Destination: Saurimo Airport, Lunda Sul Province, Angola
- Occupants: 14
- Passengers: 10
- Crew: 4
- Fatalities: 14
- Survivors: 0

On 26 December, 1998, Transafrik International Flight 806, a Lockheed L-100-30 Hercules operating a flight in Angola on behalf of the United Nations from Huambo Airport, Huambo Province, to Saurimo Airport, Lunda Sul Province, was shot down, and crashed near the town of Chicala-Choloanga. All 14 people on board were killed. The aircraft was shot down by a surface-to-air missile fired by UNITA rebels. The incident prompted the adoption of the United Nations Security Council Resolution 1219, which condemned the shootdown and asked for an independent and international mission to recover the wreckage and the occupants.

== Background ==
=== UN Mission ===
In the 1980s and 1990s the United Nations executed multiple aid supply and peacekeeping missing amidst the ongoing Angolan Civil War.

=== Aircraft ===
The aircraft involved was a Lockheed L-100-30 Hercules registered in São Tomé and Príncipe as S9-CAO and manufactured in 1974. The aircraft was owned by the angolan cargo airline Transafrik International and leased to the United Nations.

=== Occupants and flight ===
The aircraft was carrying four crew members, seven UN peacekeepers, three employees of other organisations, and a cargo of humanitarian aid from the World Food Programme destined to refugees who had fled the Huambo Province. The four crew members were sudafican captain John Wilkinson, angolan Tavares Da Silba, bolivian Carlos Melgar and filipino Benjamin Montefalcon. The seven peacekeepers came from various african countries, including Angola, Egypt, Cameroon, Zambia and Namibia. The three other passengers were two russians operating for a danish NGO, and an australian employee of a security company contracted by the UN.

== Shootdown ==
The aircraft took off from Huambo Airport and soon after started climbing, headed towards its destination at Saurimo Airport. About five minutes after departure the L-100 was hit by a surface-to-air missile. The aircraft started losing altitude, and reportedly caught fire, until it crashed in a jungle near the town of Chicala-Choloanga, Huambo Province.All 14 people on board were killed. The plane crashed in a rebel-controlled area.

== Aftermath ==
=== Ceasefire proposal ===
United Nations secretary general Kofi Annan expressed outrage for the incident and asked for a ceasefire, initially 48 hours long, but then it was asked to expand it, to allow members of the UN mission to reach the crash site, recover wreckage and look for possible survivors. The ceasefire would have also permitted to move UN troops in safer area, away from the regions of most intense fighting.

Following the shootdown, and another similar incident that occurred on December 14, flights World Food Programme aid-carrying flights were halted until December 30. And in the first week of 1999 more than a thousand UN peacekeepers were withdrawn from the area and relocated.

=== United Nations Security Council resolution ===
On December 31 the UN Security Council unanimously adopted a resolution asking UNITA to let UN staff members to reach the area of the crash site and establish the truth about the occurrence. The resolution also expressed concerns about the attacks against humanitarian planes in the region, and asked member countries to implement the sancions already approved against UNITA. The International Civil Aviation Organization expressed its willingness to help investigate the crash.

=== Recovery operations ===
Even after all the calls for a UN recovery mission the occupants of Flight 806 were still missing as of March 1999, and some weren't properly identified and brought back to their contries until 2007, nearly a decade after the crash.

== See also ==
- 1985 Aeroflot Antonov An-12 shootdown, another aircraft shot down in Angola
- TAAG Flight 462, another possible shootdown in Angola
