= Mbongo, Angola =

Town in Huambo, Angola

Mbongo
- Town
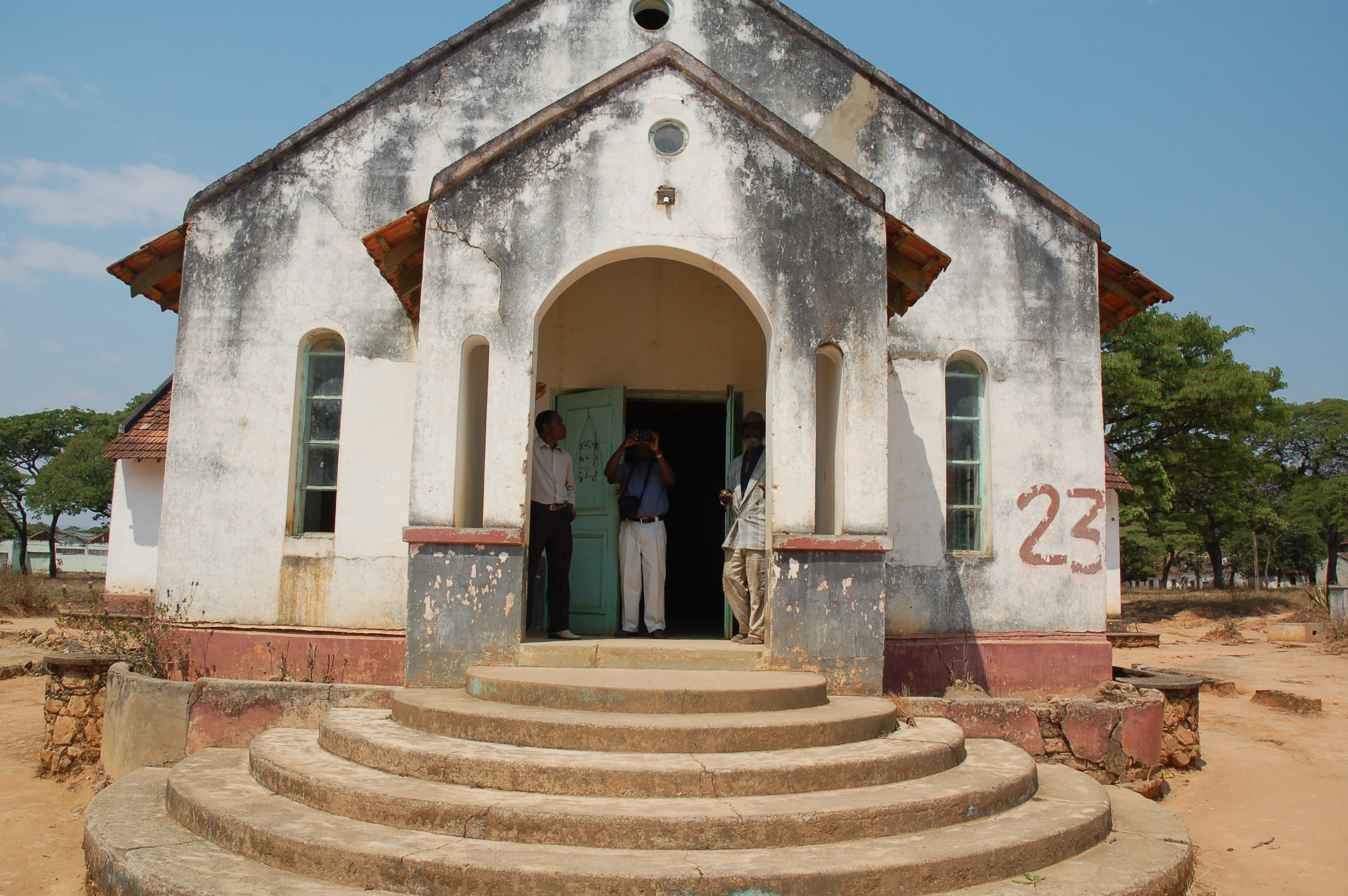
- Church at Bongo Mission

- Location within Angola
- Coordinates: 12°59′37″S 015°20′40″E
- Country: Angola
- Province: Huambo
- Municipality: Longonjo
- Subdistrict: Lépi
- Time zone: UTC+1:00 (WAT)

Mbongo (also Bongo) is a town in Lepi subdistrict, Longonjo municipality, Huambo Province, Angola, southwest Africa. Mbongo Peak is 7.75 kilometres (5 mi) to the southeast.

Bongo, as it is more often called, is the site of the Seventh-day Adventists' Adventist University of Angola, which is in the process of being rebuilt following the Angolan Civil War.
