= Longonjo =

- Municipality and town
- Location in Angola
- Coordinates: 12°54′24″S 15°11′11″E
- Country: Angola
- Province: Huambo

Area
  - Municipality and town: 941 sq mi (2,438 km^{2})

Population (2014 Census)
  - Municipality and town: 92,103
  - Density: 97.84/sq mi (37.78/km^{2})
  - Urban: 23,000
- Time zone: UTC+1 (WAT)
- Climate: Cwb

Longonjo is a town and municipality in the province of Huambo, Angola. The municipality had a population of 92,103 in 2014.

== Administrative divisions ==
The municipality is divided into four subdistricts or communes:

- Longonjo: 60 villages, 529 square kilometres (204 sq mi)
- Catabola: 36 villages, 501 square kilometres (193 sq mi)
- Chilata: 57 villages, 887 square kilometres (342 sq mi)
- Lepi: 57 villages 426 square kilometres (164 sq mi)

== Economy ==
Like most of Huambo province, the economy of Longonjo municipality is primarily agrarian, both farming and livestock raising; however Pensana's subsidiary Ozango Minerals has plans to open a rare earth mine there, in the Longonjo carbonatite intrusion (Mount Chibilundo).

There has been extensive deforestation due to the production of charcoal that supplies Angolan urban areas. This has produced additional pasture for cattle.
