= Bailundo =

- Municipality and town
- Location in Angola
- Coordinates: 12°11′45″S 15°51′20″E
- Country: Angola
- Province: Huambo

Area
  - Total: 2,765 sq mi (7,161 km^{2})

Population (2014 Census)
  - Total: 294,494
  - Density: 106.5/sq mi (41.12/km^{2})
- Climate: Cwb

Bailundo (pre-1975 Vila Teixeira da Silva) is a municipality, with a population of 294,494 (2014), and a town, with a population of 70,481 (2014), in the province of Huambo, Angola.

In the 1990s, Bailundo was the location of the headquarters of UNITA leader Jonas Savimbi.

On January 19, 2008, a Gira Globo Aeronáutica Beechcraft B200 Super King Air on approach to Huambo Airport in Huambo crashed on a mountain near Bailundo, killing all 13 people on board.

Located in Bailundo is the non-sovereign Kingdom of Bailundo. In 2021, Tchongolola Tchongonga was elected king of the Kingdom, to succeed Ekuikui IV who was deposed earlier in the same year. Kings are considered to be significant community leaders, and play important roles in local matters.

== See also ==
- Bailundo (kingdom)
