= Kokama =

Kokama or Cocama may refer to:

- Kokama people, an ethnic group of the Amazon
- Cocama language, their language

== See also ==
- Cacoma, a town in Angola
- Cacama (disambiguation)
