= Cacama =

Cacama may refer to:

- Cacama (cicada), a genus of insects
- Cacamatzin, 15th-century Aztec ruler

== See also ==
- Cacoma, a town in Angola
- Cocama (disambiguation)
