= Londuimbali =

Londuimbali Londuimbale
- Municipality and town
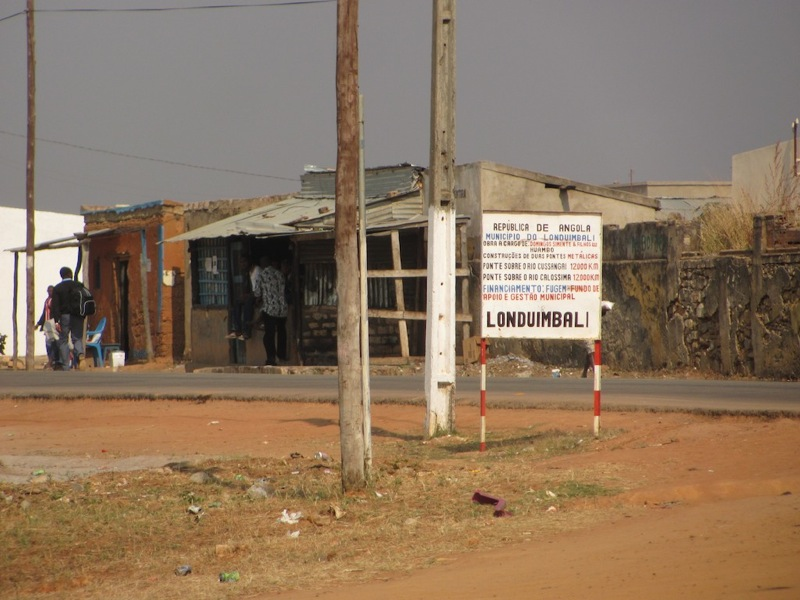
- Sign in Londuinbali

- Location in Angola
- Coordinates: 12°14′31″S 15°18′48″E
- Country: Angola
- Province: Huambo

Population (2014 Census)
  - Municipality and town: 134,254
  - Urban: 17,000
- Time zone: UTC+1 (WAT)
- Climate: Cwb

Londuimbali or Londuimbale is a town and municipality in the province of Huambo, Angola. The municipality had a population of 134,254 in 2014.
