= Chinjenje =

- Municipality and town
- Location in Angola
- Coordinates: 12°49′30.6″S 14°55′48.9″E
- Country: Angola
- Province: Huambo

Population (2014 Census)
  - Total: 30,443
- Time zone: UTC+1 (WAT)
- Climate: Cwb

Chinjenje is a town and municipality in the province of Huambo, Angola. The municipality had a population of 30,443 in 2014.
