= Frederick Hahneman =

American hijacker

Frederick William Hahneman
- Hahneman (in handcuffs) in Miami in June 1972 upon his return from Honduras
- Born: July 5, 1922; Puerto Castilla, Honduras
- Died: December 17, 1991 (aged 69); Unknown (Note: Costa Mesa, California, is listed in the Social Security Death Index as Hahneman's last place of residence, but a source noting his actual place of death is lacking.)
- Other name: George Ames
- Occupation: Engineer
- Spouse: Mary Jane Hahneman
- Children: Two sons
- Parent(s): Delia Pastore Ordóñez; William Frederick Hahneman
- Criminal charges: Aircraft piracy, kidnapping, and extortion
- Penalty: Life imprisonment (paroled after 12 years)

Frederick William Hahneman (July 5, 1922 – December 17, 1991) was a Honduras-born U.S. citizen convicted of hijacking Eastern Air Lines Flight 175 on May 5, 1972. The flight—scheduled from Allentown, Pennsylvania, to Miami, Florida, with a stop in Washington, D.C.—was hijacked by Hahneman. The hijacked plane landed twice in Washington, D.C., then once in New Orleans, where a change of planes was made due to a mechanical issue. The new plane was then flown into Honduran airspace, as demanded by Hahneman.

Hahneman parachuted from the plane over his native Honduras after extorting $303,000 from Eastern Air Lines. Evading an FBI and Honduran police manhunt and with a $25,000 bounty placed on him, Hahneman remained on the run for 28 days before finally surrendering to the U.S. embassy in Tegucigalpa. He was sentenced to life imprisonment for aircraft hijacking, kidnapping, and extortion, and was paroled after serving 12 years. Hahneman's motives were never fully understood.

== Background ==
Hahneman was born in Puerto Castilla, Honduras, to a Honduran mother, Delia Pastore Ordóñez, and an American father, the late William Frederick Hahneman, of San Francisco. The younger Hahneman served in the United States Army from April 1943 until March 1946 as a radar operator and aircraft crewman. It is not known when he was naturalized, but he had lived in Easton, Pennsylvania, since 1960. He was an engineer and married to Mary Jane Hahneman; they had two sons. Neighbors of the couple later told investigators that Hahneman was a mystery to them and that Mary, going blind, raised the children alone.

== Historical context ==
The period 1967–1972 saw a spate of aircraft hijackings in the U.S. and worldwide. There had been 26 attempted hijackings in 1971, 11 of which were successful. They had become so common that a May 8, 1972, editorial in Evening Chronicle reported, "They often command little more than one-column, six-paragraph stories on page 8 of most daily newspapers."

The hijackings were a mixture of terrorism and crime for profit. The most infamous of these hijackings is arguably that of D. B. Cooper, which occurred just six months prior to Hahneman's boarding Flight 175.

== The hijacking ==
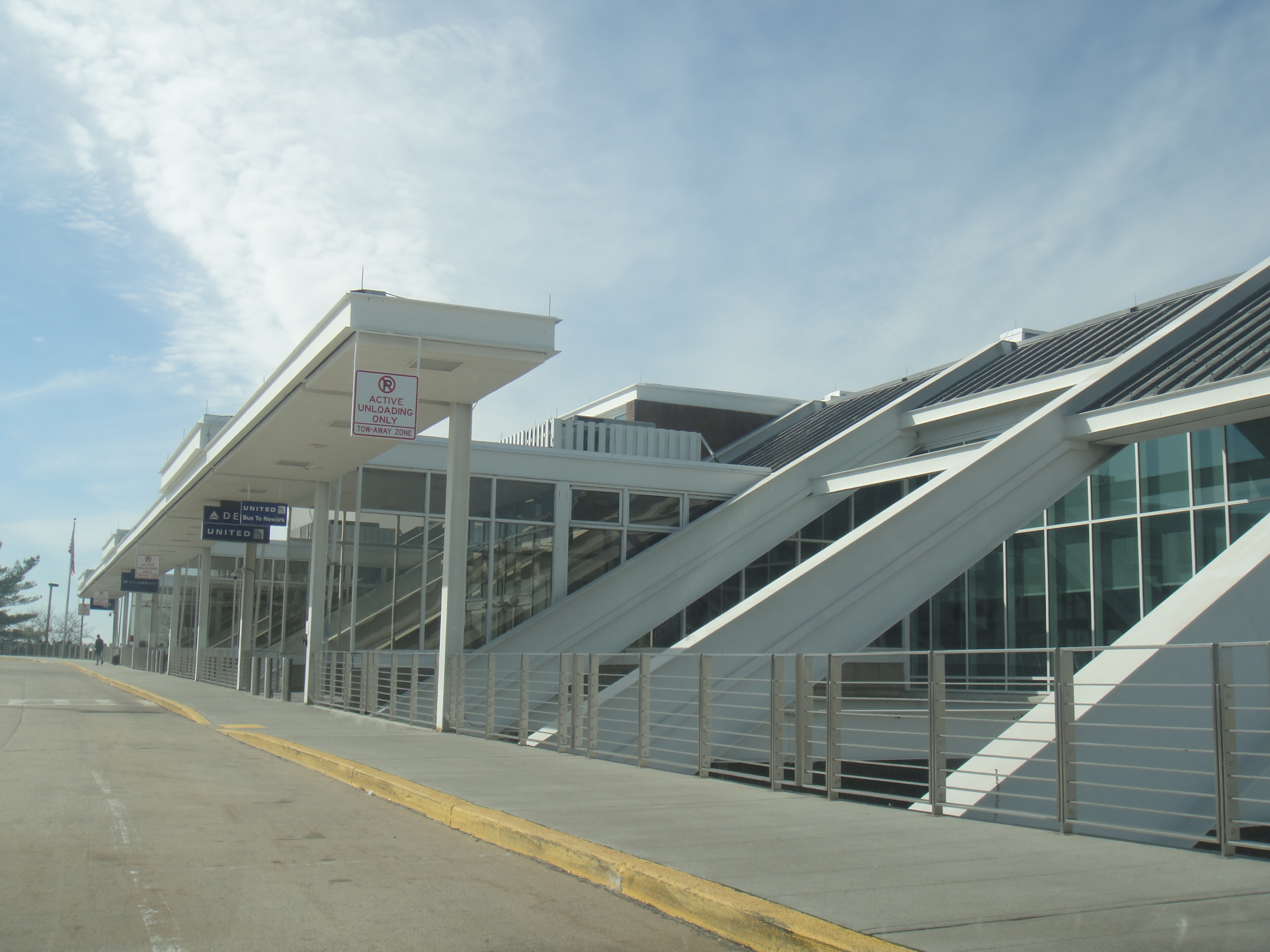
The main terminal at Lehigh Valley International Airport, then known as ABE International

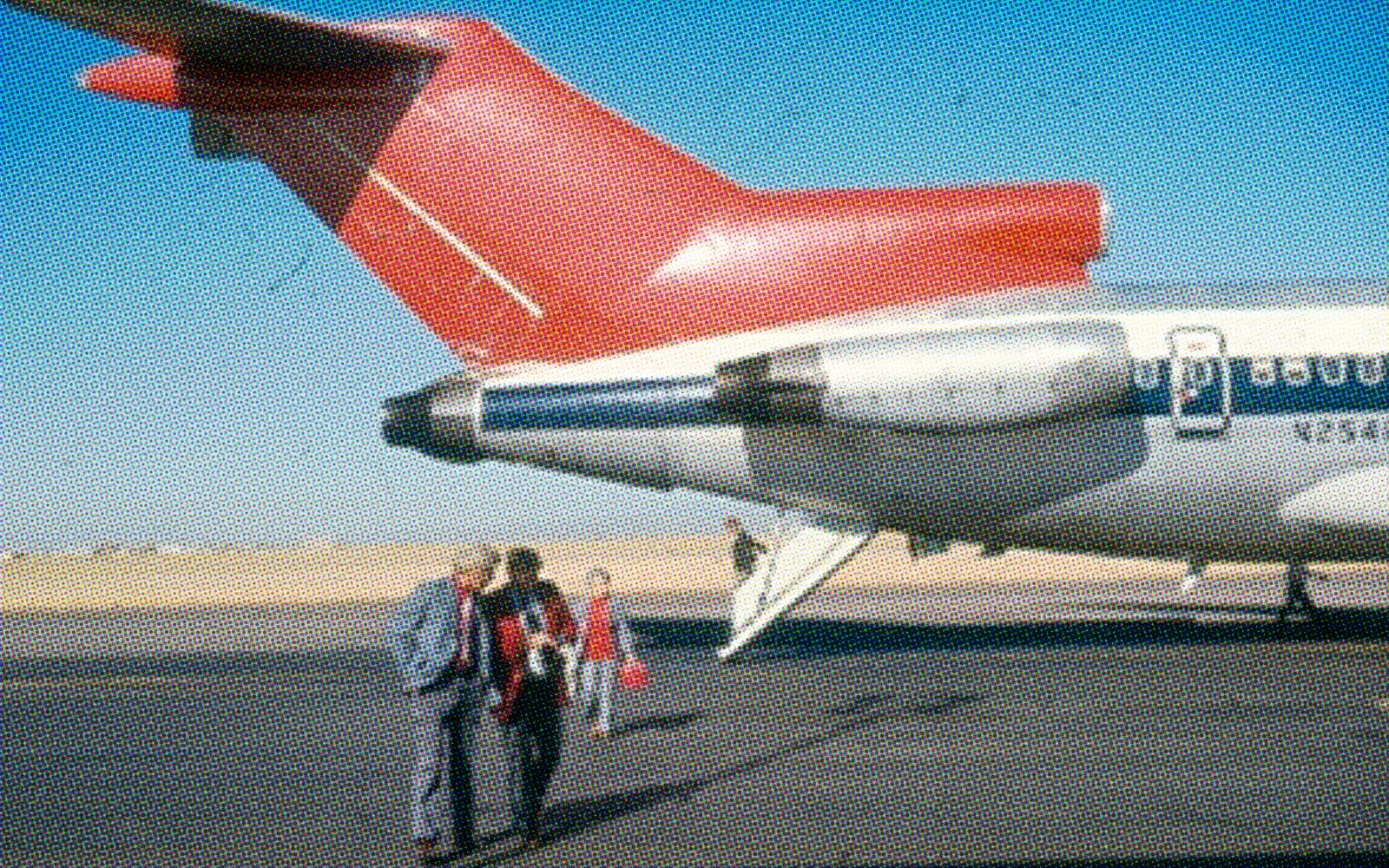
A Boeing 727 with the airstair open, which was Hahneman's means of escape

On May 2, 1972, Hahneman checked into the Americus Hotel in Allentown, Pennsylvania, as a well-dressed businessman under the assumed name George Ames. Staff remembered him as "polite" but got the impression that Ames had "put up a wall around himself". After asking directions from a travel agent, staff later reported Ames saying he was "going to take a plane" later that morning.

On the morning of May 5, 1972, Hahneman managed to board Eastern Air Lines Flight 175, a Boeing 727 jet, at Lehigh Valley International Airport, known then as ABE International Airport, while armed with a handgun. Shortly after take-off, Hahneman threatened the crew and informed the pilot, Captain W. L. Hendershott, that he was taking over the plane and wanted $303,000 ($2.33 million in 2025) from the airline.

As the captain informed the 48 passengers that, "there is an armed man aboard", Hahneman held the chief stewardess hostage at the rear of the plane. One of the passengers, The New York Times reporter Neil Amdur, wrote later, "From the moment the captain uttered those chilling words...I felt a sense of fear I had never known." The captain would later tell FBI investigators that Hahneman, "talked like there was another country and he wanted the money for a cause." Two other passengers, Frank Valek, a safety inspector for Western Electric, and Robert Palazzo, the mayor of Columbia, New Jersey, both found Hahneman's gun pressed into their stomachs as they went to the rest room and magazine rack, respectively. Other passengers prayed.

Flight 175 was scheduled to land at Washington's National Airport but Hahneman, at 11:15 am, ordered the captain to land at Dulles International Airport. No passengers were allowed to leave the plane while Eastern Air Lines worked to meet Hahneman's demands. These were $303,000 in cash, six parachutes, two bush knives, two jump suits, two crash helmets, fuel, food, and two cartons of his favorite cigarettes (Benson & Hedges).

Satisfied that his demands had been met, Hahneman allowed the passengers to disembark one by one at 1:13 pm, including one stewardess. The rest of the six crew he kept hostage, and ordered the captain to take off again at 1:50 pm. Soon after becoming airborne, Hahneman decided he didn't like the $100 bill denominations given to him by Eastern. (Note: Newspaper reports posited that Hahneman wanted to reduce the weight "to lighten his parachute load.") He ordered the plane to return to Dulles and demanded the money in larger bills. (Note: The issuing of large denominations of United States currency (values larger than $100) was officially discontinued in 1969, but existing currency remains legal tender.) It took Eastern four hours to comply with this difficult demand, with some of the bills being flown in from Miami.

Satisfied once again, Hahneman ordered the captain to take off and fly to Honduras in Central America, his country of birth. However, while en route, the plane's hydraulic pump developed a problem and the captain told Hahneman they had to divert to New Orleans. Hahneman was angry and when they landed in New Orleans he demanded another plane from Eastern. When it was ready, he put a noose around Captain Hendershott's neck and forced the crew out at gunpoint, using them as a human shield to get safely onto the new plane.

The remainder of Flight 175 passed without incident, and on May 6, around 4 am, over the pitch-dark Honduran jungle, Hahneman ordered the captain to slow the plane's airspeed. He put on one of the parachutes he had demanded and opened the rear door. Clutching his money-filled attache case, Hahneman jumped from the aft airstair into the dense undergrowth below, and disappeared.

== Manhunt ==
In the U.S., the story ultimately faded from the news. But in Honduras, Hahneman was on the run from the FBI and the Honduran police. He moved around between friends and family, trying to stay one step ahead. Eastern Air Lines put up a $25,000 reward ($192,422 in 2025) for his capture, which ultimately led to a tip off that Hahneman was still in Honduras. With his picture now everywhere in Honduras and exposure close, Hahneman sought refuge with his old friend and fellow engineer, José Gómez Rovelo.

On June 1, L. Patrick Gray III, acting FBI director, obtained a warrant in United States District Court in Alexandria, Virginia, for Hahneman's arrest. The FBI had put together biographical information Hahneman had let slip to the crew during their 20-hour ordeal, with a photograph they possessed, to identify Hahneman as their prime suspect. They said Hahneman's movements in rural Honduras had been traced by the Honduran police.

With the net closing, Rovelo convinced Hahneman that he was too old to be on the run. Hahneman agreed. At 1 am on June 2, Hahneman and Rovelo walked into the US embassy in Tegucigalpa, and Hahneman surrendered.

== Aftermath ==
Hahneman was in custody but the money was not. He told authorities that he had deposited the ransom in "the Chinese Communist Bank in Hong Kong", via a mysterious Panamanian "contact".

On September 11, 1972, Hahneman waived his right to a jury trial and pleaded guilty to a charge of air piracy, kidnapping and extortion. He was sentenced to life imprisonment on September 29, 1972, in the US District Court in Alexandria, Virginia, and sent to the federal prison in Atlanta.

As he left the federal building for prison, Hahneman was asked by a reporter what he'd done with the money. "None of your bloody business," he replied.

On May 8, 1973, the FBI announced they had recovered the $303,000 ransom. In the press release, they said that a check was made through the National Crime Information Center, which determined the serial numbers tallied with the ransom money. They provided no further details of how or where they recovered the money.

Bureau of Prisons records show Frederick Hahneman was paroled on March 13, 1984. On August 17, 1984, he was discharged. The Bureau has no further records of him.

== Speculation about motives ==
Hahneman's arrest reignited interest in the case and his quiet Easton neighbourhood was alive with agents and reporters asking questions. His blind wife and his sons' lives were spread across the local press. Fed by the FBI's reluctance to reveal details of how and where they recovered the money, along with Hahneman's political claims while in custody and the statement from the captain, there was much speculation about Hahneman's frequent foreign trips, rumours that he'd deposited the $303,000 in a communist bank, and claims that Hahneman and his cousin Roberto Martínez Ordóñez, a delegate with the Honduran mission to the United Nations, were plotting a revolution in Honduras.

Mary Hahneman maintained that she had no contact with her husband and didn't even know he'd been released. Asked after his 1984 discharge, she said, "I still don't know why he did it. If you ever find out, will you please tell me?"

== See also ==
- List of aircraft hijackings
- List of accidents and incidents involving the Boeing 727
