= Catabola (commune) =

- Commune
- Location in Angola
- Country: Angola
- Province: Huambo

Area
  - Total: 193 sq mi (501 km^{2})

Population (2014)
  - Total: 12,846
  - Density: 66.4/sq mi (25.6/km^{2})
- Time zone: UTC+1 (WAT)
- Climate: Aw

Catabola is a commune of Angola, located in the province of Huambo.

== See also ==
- Communes of Angola
