= Calima, Angola =

Coordinates: 11°31′S 17°28′E

Calima
- Commune
- Location in Angola
- Country: Angola
- Province: Huambo
- Time zone: UTC+1 (WAT)
- Climate: Aw

Calima is a town and commune of Angola, located in the province of Huambo.

== See also ==
- Communes of Angola
