= Mexicana de Aviación Flight 940 =

1986 aviation accident in Mexico

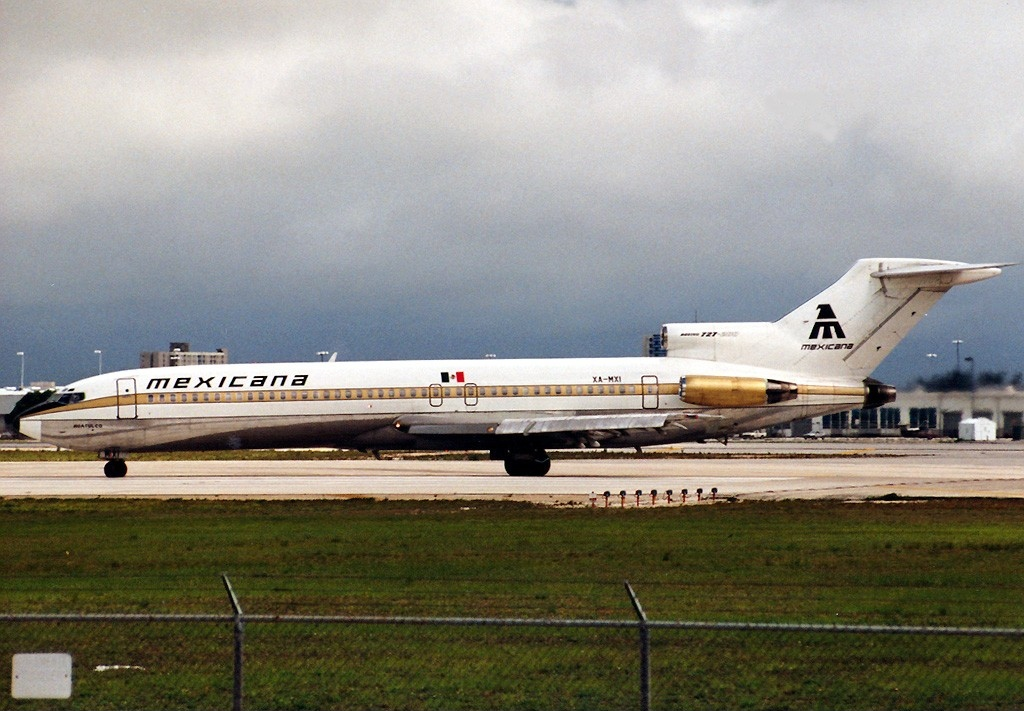
- A Mexicana Boeing 727, similar to the one involved

Accident
- Date: March 31, 1986
- Summary: In-flight fire due to faulty maintenance, leading to loss of control and in-flight breakup
- Site: Sierra Madre Occidental, near Maravatío, Michoacán, Mexico; 19°49′59.92″N 100°15′59.96″W

Aircraft
- Aircraft type: Boeing 727-264
- Aircraft name: Veracruz
- Operator: Mexicana de Aviación
- IATA flight No.: MX940
- ICAO flight No.: MXA940
- Call sign: MEXICANA 940
- Registration: XA-MEM
- Flight origin: Mexico City International Airport, Mexico City, Mexico
- 1st stopover: Licenciado Gustavo Díaz Ordaz International Airport, Puerto Vallarta, Jalisco, Mexico
- Last stopover: Mazatlán International Airport, Mazatlán, Sinaloa, Mexico
- Destination: Los Angeles International Airport, Los Angeles, California, United States
- Occupants: 167
- Passengers: 159
- Crew: 8
- Fatalities: 167
- Survivors: 0

Mexicana de Aviación Flight 940 was a scheduled international flight from Mexico City to Los Angeles with stopovers in Puerto Vallarta and Mazatlán. On March 31, 1986, the Boeing 727 Veracruz, registered as XA-MEM, crashed into El Carbón, a mountain in the Sierra Madre Occidental mountain range northwest of Mexico City. All 159 passengers and 8 crew members on board died in the crash. With 167 deaths, the crash of Flight 940 is the deadliest aviation disaster ever on Mexican soil, and the deadliest involving a Boeing 727.

An inquiry was opened by the Mexican government, with additional assistance from the National Transportation Safety Board. The investigation concluded that the crash was caused by a tire explosion in the left rear wheel well; faulty brakes resulted in excessive friction on take-off and the overheating of the left rear landing gear tires, which exploded. The explosion ignited fuel and hydraulic fluids, causing a fire to quickly grow and melt parts of the fuselage, resulting in structural failure and an in-flight breakup.

== Aircraft ==
The aircraft involved in the crash was a Boeing 727-200 with MSN number 2241, and was named Veracruz by Mexicana. Built in 1981, it was initially planned to be delivered to Braniff International Airways; however, Braniff shut down passenger flight operations in 1982 and the aircraft was eventually delivered to Mexicana. The aircraft had accrued a total flying time of 13,675 hours and a total of 10,252 flight cycles. The last major maintenance check was conducted the previous year. The engines, three JT8D-17R from Pratt & Whitney, were in good condition.

== Passengers and crew ==
| Nationality | Passengers | Crew | Total |
|---|---|---|---|
| Mexico | 139 | 8 | 147 |
| France | 8 | 0 | 8 |
| United States | 6 | 0 | 6 |
| Sweden | 4 | 0 | 4 |
| Canada | 2 | 0 | 2 |
| Total | 159 | 8 | 167 |

The aircraft carried a total of 167 passengers and crews. Of those, a total of 147 passengers (139 passengers and 8 crew members) were from Mexico. Spanish newspaper El País reported that there were at least 20 foreigners on board, with eight from France, six from the United States, four from Sweden, and two from Canada. The French embassy later confirmed that at least 8 passengers of its nationals were on board, all from a single family. The Swedish Embassy stated that one of its staff and her children were on board the flight. According to UPI, there were 22 children aboard the flight.

The plane was commanded by 36-year-old Captain Carlos Alberto Guadarrama Sixtos, who had joined Mexicana in December 1971, and had 6,328 hours of total flying experience. The first officer was 34-year-old Philip Louis Piaget Rhorer, hired by Mexicana in April 1980; he had a little over 1,769 total flying hours. The second officer, 29-year-old Ángel Carlos Peñasco Espinoza, was hired by Mexicana in 1982, and had 1,142 total flying hours. The crew of eight included five flight attendants.

Among the passengers was Graciela Flores, the wife of Captain Sixtos and a retired flight attendant, as well as both of their children. Flores had survived the crash of Mexicana de Aviación Flight 801 in 1969. They had planned to travel across the United States when they arrived. Also among the passengers was Guillermo Sánchez, the cousin of former Mexican footballer Hugo Sánchez. Mexican art director Agustín Ytuarte and location manager Federico Ysunza, who were both participating in the filming of the movie Predator, was also on board the flight.

American tennis player Derrick Rostagno was booked on the flight as a connecting flight, but he stayed in Mexico City to play a match.

== Accident ==
=== Prior Flights ===
The aircraft had flown from Mexico City International Airport to Chicago O’Hare International Airport the day prior, on March 30 as Flight 806. The aircraft returned from Chicago the next day at 07:12 a.m, as Flight 185. Both flights were uneventful; however, both crews noted concerns regarding the aircraft's handling and components.

The Chicago-bound crew noted that braking felt “uneven” and that the right side landing gear had air in the brake lines, which maintenance crews at Chicago rectified by bleeding the brakes. The Mexico City-bound crew noted a missing connecting rod for landing gear #2, a 120-foot difference between the crew’s altimeters, higher-than-normal pressure in hydraulic system B, vibration in the Engine 1 and 2 throttle handles during acceleration, and a missing opening lever for the rear air stair. With the exceptions of the air stair lever and hydraulic system B pressure, these problems were rectified by personnel in Mexico City and the aircraft was allowed to be put back into service.

=== Accident Flight ===
Flight 940 was scheduled to take off from Mexico City en route to Los Angeles International Airport, with scheduled stopovers in Puerto Vallarta and Mazatlán. With 159 passengers and 8 crew members, the aircraft taxied onto Runway 05L. At around 08:50 local time, the aircraft began its take-off run. While rolling on the runway, the crew noted that the aircraft felt heavier than usual and was not accelerating as expected. Realizing this, Captain Sixtos ordered First Officer Piaget to increase thrust, and the thrust levers were moved to full power; the aircraft then took off, approximately 11 seconds later than estimated by the crew.

At 09:04:44, fifteen minutes after takeoff, the aircraft was cruising at an altitude of 29,400 feet when an explosion rocked the fuselage. The explosion broke the aft cabin floor, causing a loss of cabin pressure and prompting the oxygen masks to drop. Multiple alarms, including the depressurization alarm, began to sound in the cockpit. The pilots declared an emergency and requested Mexico City ATC to get a lower altitude while attempting to diagnose the situation.

As the crew was trying to figure out the emergency, a flight attendant reported that there was a fire inside the cabin, which had originated from the hole in the broken cabin floor. Smoke was entering the cabin, and the rear of the fuselage got hotter as the fire grew. Passengers seated at the back were moved forward to avoid the heat and fire. At 9:06, the crew contacted Mexico City ATC and asked for an emergency landing in Mexico City, which was approved. By this time, the fire had grown so large that eyewitnesses on the ground reported seeing smoke and flames trailing behind the aircraft as it descended.

The crew had reported that they were losing altitude, and later that they had lost the No. 1 engine. The fire continued to grow, severely damaging the control cables and making the aircraft harder to control. The intensity of the fire caused large parts of the rear fuselage to weaken or melt, and the tail section of the aircraft (which included all three engines and the T-tail) separated from the aircraft roughly 4 minutes after the explosion. The aircraft struck El Carbón mountain near the town of Maravatío, Michoacán, and burst into flames at around 9:11, with the tail section striking the top of a hill and the main fuselage striking a ravine at the base of the hill, at an inverted angle. All 159 passengers and 8 crew members died in the crash.

== Response ==
=== Immediate aftermath ===
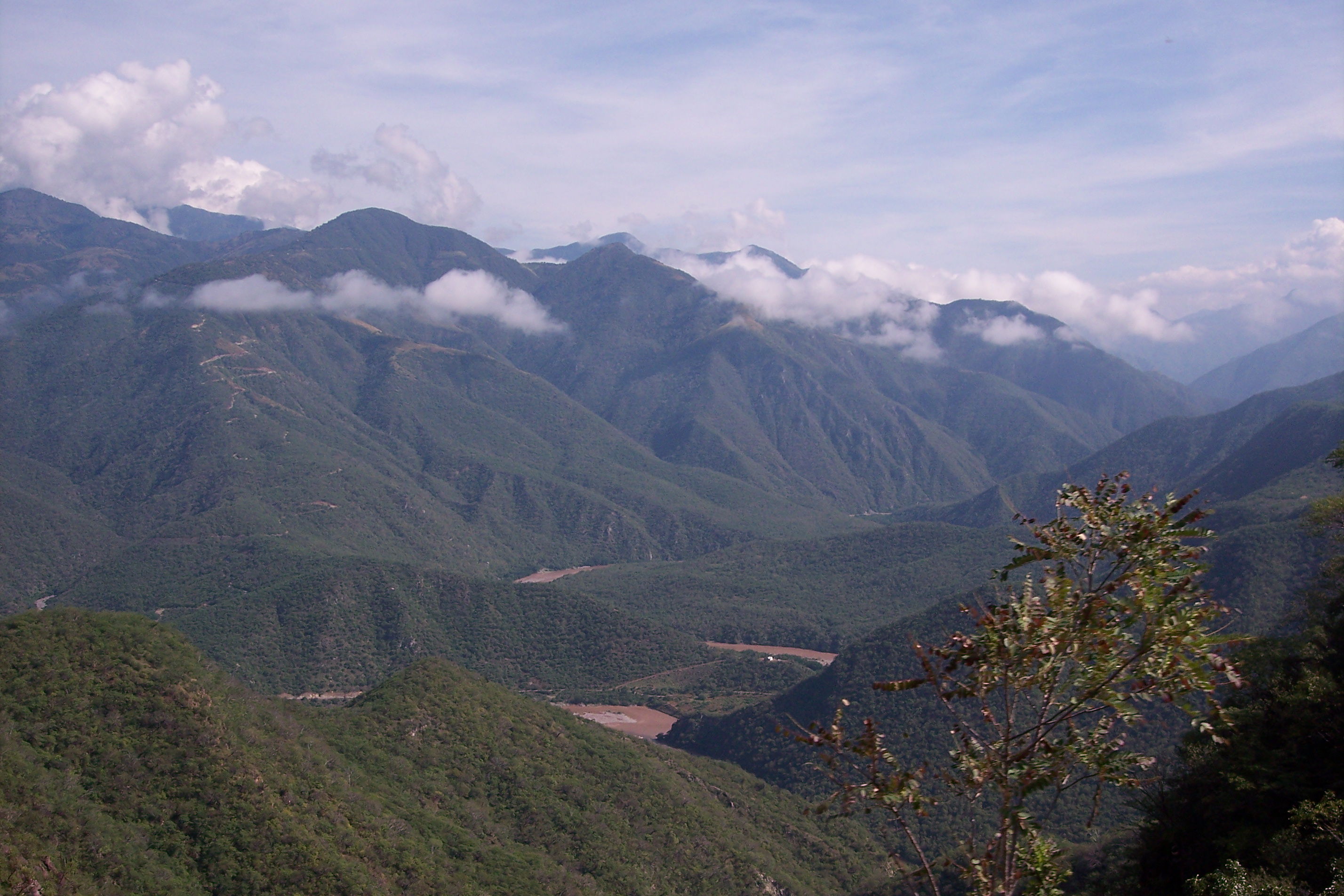
The crash occurred in the Sierra Madre Occidental mountain range

External videos
- Crash site footage
- News report and footage of the crash site on YouTube

Mexico City ATC lost contact with Flight 940 roughly 3 minutes after it made the request to return to Mexico City, and the aircraft disappeared from radar soon after. After multiple failed attempts to call the crew, Flight 940 was declared as missing and emergency personnel were dispatched to search for the plane. Mexico City ATC would receive a call from Toluca Airport’s ATC minutes later, reporting that a smoke column rising from the Sierra Madre mountain range was visible to controllers in the tower, and that they were receiving calls from local residents alerting that an aircraft had crashed in the foothills of the mountain range near San Miguel El Alto, in the municipality of Maravatio, Michoacan. Local police and the Mexican Army were dispatched to the crash site.

The crash site was found within hours, and the main wreckage was found within a 800 square meter area, scattered among the Sierra Madre Occidental range due to the in-flight breakup. The tail section was found at the hilltop with at least 20 bodies inside, while the front portion, which constituted the majority of the aircraft and its occupants, was found in a ravine. Fuel was still burning from the crash site by the time rescue workers had arrrived.

At least 500 personnel were dispatched for the recovery efforts, most of whom were soldiers and members of the Mexican Red Cross. Local volunteers were also assisting. However, the crash site was remote and difficult to reach; the nearest road was located at least 14 km from the site, and rescuers had to walk by foot to reach the crash site. Some of the team were flown by helicopter, but still had to walk on foot due to the vegetation and hilly terrain forbidding helicopter landing. Firefighters arrived and managed to douse the flames approximately eight hours after the crash. Multiple reports of looting by peasants and local officials began to emerge as well.

Due to the remoteness of the site and hilly terrain, rescuers had to use mules and donkeys to take the bodies away from the crash site. The victims would be carried to Maravatio and then flown to Morelia before finally being flown to Mexico City. Mexico’s Forensic Medical Service (SEMEFO) stated that bodies would be handed over by April 1, while the bodies of non-Mexican victims of the crash would be handed over to their respective embassies. Families of the victims were asked to gather at Mexico City's morgue to identify the victims.

Mexicana de Aviación established a special office in Mexico City for the families of the victims. The airline later added that the families would be compensated, including victims' repatriation and insurance claims from relatives. Mexicana Airlines director Manuel Sosa de la Vega was ordered by the Mexican Congress to testify following charges that the airline had neglected maintenance and safety standards, allegations which the airline and the mechanics and ground crew union denied.

By April 1, all of the bodies had been recovered from the crash site. A total of 109 bodies were recovered on that day, and all were flown to Mexico City on four flights. Rescuers also managed to retrieve the aircraft's Flight Data Recorder and Cockpit Voice Recorder, which would be transported to Mexico City for analysis.

=== Controversy ===
Following initial reports that the aircraft had suffered an in-flight decompression, speculations began to run wild. Mexican authorities confirmed that, based on the communication made between the pilots and ATC, a depressurization event had occurred during the flight. Officials at Mexicana refuted claims that Flight 940 had been bombed. Additionally, the Mexican Association of Travel Agents stated that they did not believe that the aircraft had been brought down by an act of terrorism, adding reassurance that the tourism industry of the nation would not be affected by the disaster.

However, just days after the crash, two militant groups issued a written statement claiming that they had bombed Flight 940. The groups, identified as the Organization of Arab Revolutionary Brigades (an alias of the Abu Nidal Organization) and the Egypt Revolutionary Organization, claimed responsibility for the crash of Flight 940, with both stating stated that the bombing was carried out "in retaliation for the imperialist American military invasion of the Libyan Popular Arab Republic and in revenge for the fascist, Zionist, U.S. raid on Mieh Mieh camp in Southern Lebanon". Both groups identified the purported perpetrator as Mohammed Mustafa Muhsin Al-Mashoor. Lebanese intelligence, however, confirmed that they had never received any reports of plans from the groups to attack commercial airlines. Officials opined that the statement might have been made for propaganda.

Two days after the crash of Flight 940, Trans World Airlines Flight 840 was bombed by the Abu Nidal Organization, the same group that had claimed responsibility for the Mexicana crash. In response to both the TWA bombing and the alleged downing of Flight 940, the International Federation of Airline Pilots Associations (IFALPA) issued a statement calling for strengthening the security of flights. Some even proposed to boycott flights due to the perceived lack of security oversight. Then-President of IFALPA, Reg Smith, called for leaders to enact sanctions against countries that provided sanctuary to terror groups or encouraged hijacking commercial airlines.

Despite initial statements made by officials denying that the aircraft had been bombed, multiple pilots from Mexicana challenged the statement after they managed to get a readout of the aircraft's Flight Data Recorder. A total of 10 pilots claimed that the crash might have been part of a life insurance scam from a disgruntled passenger, as evidenced by the first audible explosion and the second larger explosion, which directly caused the aircraft to break up. Both airline and government officials condemned the accusation, calling them premature. However, UPI reported that Mexicana had issued an "internal memorandum" for all personnel, regarding significant changes in handling baggage and cargo following suspicions that Flight 940 had been brought down by on-board explosives.

Nearly two months after the crash, Mexican government officials from the Secretariat of Communications and Transportation (SCT) announced that preliminary data from the flight recorders indicated that the possible cause of the in-flight decompression might have been an exploding tire. The SICT added that the explosion might have severed the hydraulic and fuel lines of the aircraft, causing the fire to grow. The official preliminary report added that there was no evidence of explosives on board the aircraft, conclusively dismissing rumors and claims that the aircraft had been brought down by bombs.

== Investigation ==
Mexicana de Aviación set up a special commission to investigate the crash. As the aircraft was American-made, representatives from the United States’ National Transportation Safety Board (NTSB), Federal Aviation Administration (FAA), Boeing, and Pratt & Whitney would be sent to Mexico to assist with the investigation. The FDR and CVR readout would be conducted in Mexico City.

In the immediate aftermath of the crash, a decompression which led to structural failure was identified as the main cause of the crash. This was evidenced by the distribution of the wreckage, which was scattered across a wide area. The left landing gear and parts of the aircraft were found at least 32 kilometers from the main wreckage. The two crash site locations further indicated that the aircraft had suffered structural failure in mid-flight, possibly from the decompression. ATC recording further supported the theory as the crew had requested for lower altitude after a depressurization event.

The investigation initially considered every possible cause of the depressurization, including sabotage and maintenance failure. Suspicions initially leaned more towards sabotage as two Middle Eastern terrorist groups claimed responsibility for this crash along with the bombing of TWA Flight 840 with an anonymous letter signed by those groups claimed that a suicide mission had sabotaged the plane in retaliation against the United States. This was dismissed.

=== In-flight breakup and fire ===
The investigators determined that the plausible cause of the aircraft’s in-flight breakup was a fire aboard the aircraft. This theory was supported by multiple findings on the wreckage and crash site. Several parts of the airframe showed signs of melting due to intense heat; aluminium spray was found extensively on the wreckage, as well as “strings” of aluminum that had melted onto other surfaces of the aircraft. These types of molten metal deposits were indicative of a pre-crash fire, as molten metal spray and stringing typically happen while the aircraft is still flying.

The in-flight fire theory was also corroborated by multiple witnesses, who claimed that the aircraft was on fire shortly before crashing; witnesses also claimed that smoke could be seen trailing from the tailplane and that burning aircraft debris could be seen falling down to the ground. The CVR recording confirmed the theory, as one of the flight attendants could be heard telling the flight crew that a fire had erupted in the cabin shortly after the explosion.

The fire could not be contained, as it was located in the center wing box space, between the aircraft's outer surface and cabin floor, and out of reach of any fire suppression methods. Due to the explosion blowing the landing gear doors open and the aircraft's cruising speed at the time of the explosion, the fire managed to grow quickly. Due to the central bulkhead being just ahead of the wing box, the explosion caused air to enter the cargo hold and flow back of the aircraft, coming out through air drains located on the vertical stabilizer or other damaged areas of the aircraft. The tight, chimney stack-like space where the fire was located and the high airflow caused a forced convection that fed a stack effect, intensifying the fire. The combination of these effects and its location in a difficult-to-access area caused the fire to grow uncontrollably.

The initial explosion damaged at least one of the aircraft's pressurized fuel line to Engine No. 1 and APU, causing it to release flammable liquids. The fire worsened as it began to damage hydraulic lines carrying flammable liquid, causing the fire to possibly exceed 1650 °C due to the combination of fuels and stack effect. The inferno, which would have exceeded the melting point of aluminum, was so intense that it managed to melt a significant amount of the aircraft’s rear airframe in just a span of four minutes. The weakened structure subsequently failed and the tail completely separated.

=== Cause of fire ===
Investigators thought that the fire likely had originated from the left wheel well, as indicated by the distribution of the wreckage and findings found during visual inspection of recovered aircraft components. Parts of the left landing gear and the landing gear door were found several kilometers away from the crash site, which supported the hypothesis that the explosion had originated from the left wheel well.

Attention then turned towards the cause of explosion itself, which was theorized to have likely been caused by overheating. Previous crews had reported uneven braking, and the aircraft had suffered unusually high drag forces during the accident flight’s take-off, which investigators believed was caused by the brakes dragging, causing its temperature to rise dramatically. The CVR recording backed this hypothesis, in which Captain Sixtos was heard saying that the aircraft felt heavier and that the take-off was taking longer than usual.

Multiple forensic tests conducted on the aircraft's brake assemblies revealed that there were multiple defects on the number 1 (left) brake assembly, which would have caused the left landing gear to drag during the takeoff. A closer examination of the left landing gear assembly revealed that the tire had overheated at some point prior to the crash, with the temperature believed to have reached over 871 °C.

This overheating would have caused several parts of the brake assembly to fail both prior to and during the accident flight, mainly the lining of the brake pads; high temperatures would cause the linings to bind with the mobile brake disks, generating excessive drag even when not braking. Some brake linings were also found to had completely failed, having fallen of the brake pads and in between the brake disks, worsening the drag forces.

Soon after taking off, the overheated landing gear was retracted and the landing gear door was closed, sealing the landing gear assembly inside the wheel well. As there was little ventilation in the wheel well, temperature increased as hot air released from the brake assembly built up in the well. The heat from the landing gear assembly and air in the wheel well then began to heat the air inside the landing gear’s tires, and thermal expansion caused pressure to build up inside the tires; eventually, the conditions reached a point where the tire burst.

Investigators later discovered that the tires had been filled with atmospheric air instead of inert nitrogen gas. They believed that at the moment that the tire burst, the oxygen that was present in the tire’s air fed an initial ignition, which generated a powerful explosion in the wheel well.

The initial explosion damaged two fuel feeder lines connected to a highly pressurized fuel tank, which were located directly above the wheel well; subsequently, fuel began leaking from at least one line and ignited. Several hydraulic lines, whose fluids were also flammable, were also damaged and fed the fire, causing it to grow significantly.

=== Conclusion ===
Mexican authorities concluded that the cause of the crash was as follows:

Failure in the brake system causing the number one assembly to drag, generating high temperatures which when transmitted to the mass (wheel) and to the air in the tires, caused the explosion of tire number one, fragmenting the mass (wheel) number two, breaking the fuel line that feeds the engine number one and hydraulic lines, causing an intense fire that destroyed the lower rear part of the fuselage, weakening the lower structure, causing the detachment of the aircraft and consequently the loss of control of the aircraft

— Accident Report and Opinion, page 44-45, Commission for the Investigation and Determination of Aviation Accidents

Mexican authorities issued 7 recommendations, including the installation of temperature detecting system in the wheel-well, the addition of another ventilation within the wheel-well, and the mandatory use of nitrogen for tire filling.

== Aftermath ==
About a year after the crash, the FAA released an Airworthiness Directive requiring the use of dry nitrogen or other inert gases when filling the tires on braked wheels of most commercial airliners. The crash remains the deadliest airline disaster in Mexican history and is the world's deadliest air disaster involving the Boeing 727.

== See also ==
- Swissair Flight 306 - a 1963 crash caused by an inflight fire triggered by a landing gear failure on takeoff
- Nigeria Airways Flight 2120 - a 1991 crash where under-inflated tyres overheated and started a fire onboard which destroyed vital hydraulic and control cables leading to a loss of control
- Propair Flight 420 - a 1998 crash where a fire started in the left wheel well of a Fairchild Metroliner.
