= Sousa Jamba =

Angolan writer (born 1966)

- Born: 9 January 1966 (age 60); Dondi, Huambo, Angola
- Education: University of Westminster; Seton Hall University
- Occupations: Author and journalist
- Notable work: Patriots (1992)

Sousa Jamba (born 9 January 1966) is an Angolan author and journalist.

== Biography ==
Sousa Jamba was born in 1966 in Dondi, Huambo, in central Angola. His family were all supporters of the National Union for the Total Independence of Angola (UNITA), which fought alongside the MPLA (the People's Movement for the Liberation of Angola) in the Angolan War of Independence (1961–75) and then against the MPLA in the ensuing civil war (1975–2002). In 1975, nine-year-old Jamba with his family left the country, fleeing the violence following Angola's independence, and went to Zambia, where he lived as a refugee, before going to England. Jamba has said: "There was a sense that if you were from Unita you either had to leave the country or go out into the bush, which is precisely what my family did."

In 1985, Jamba returned to Angola, and worked as a reporter and translator for the UNITA News Agency. In 1986, he went to study in Britain on a journalism scholarship, and soon began writing for The Spectator. From 1988 to 1991, he studied for a BA degree in Media Studies at Westminster University, London. He also has a master's degree in Leadership and Strategic Communications from Seton Hall University in New Jersey, United States. He returned to his home country after 27 years of exile.

Jamba's books include Patriots (1992), an autobiographical work of fiction that received much critical acclaim. Andrew McKie of The Telegraph writes of it: "Sousa Jamba's brilliant and terrifying (and often very funny) novel Patriots gives an account of a child's view of the war in Angola." Jamba's second novel, A Lonely Devil, was published in 1993. He has written widely for newspapers and journals, among them Granta, The Spectator and the New Statesman. He writes a weekly column for the Angolan newspaper Semanario Angolense. He also writes a column on leadership for the business magazine Exame. He currently lives in Jacksonville, Florida, USA.

Jamba is a contributor to the 2005 book The Silver Throat of the Moon: Writing in Exile, edited by Jennifer Langer.

== Bibliography ==
- Patriots (1992)
- A Lonely Devil (1993)
- On The Banks Of The Zambezi (1993)
