= LACSA Flight 628 =

1988 aviation accident in Costa Rica

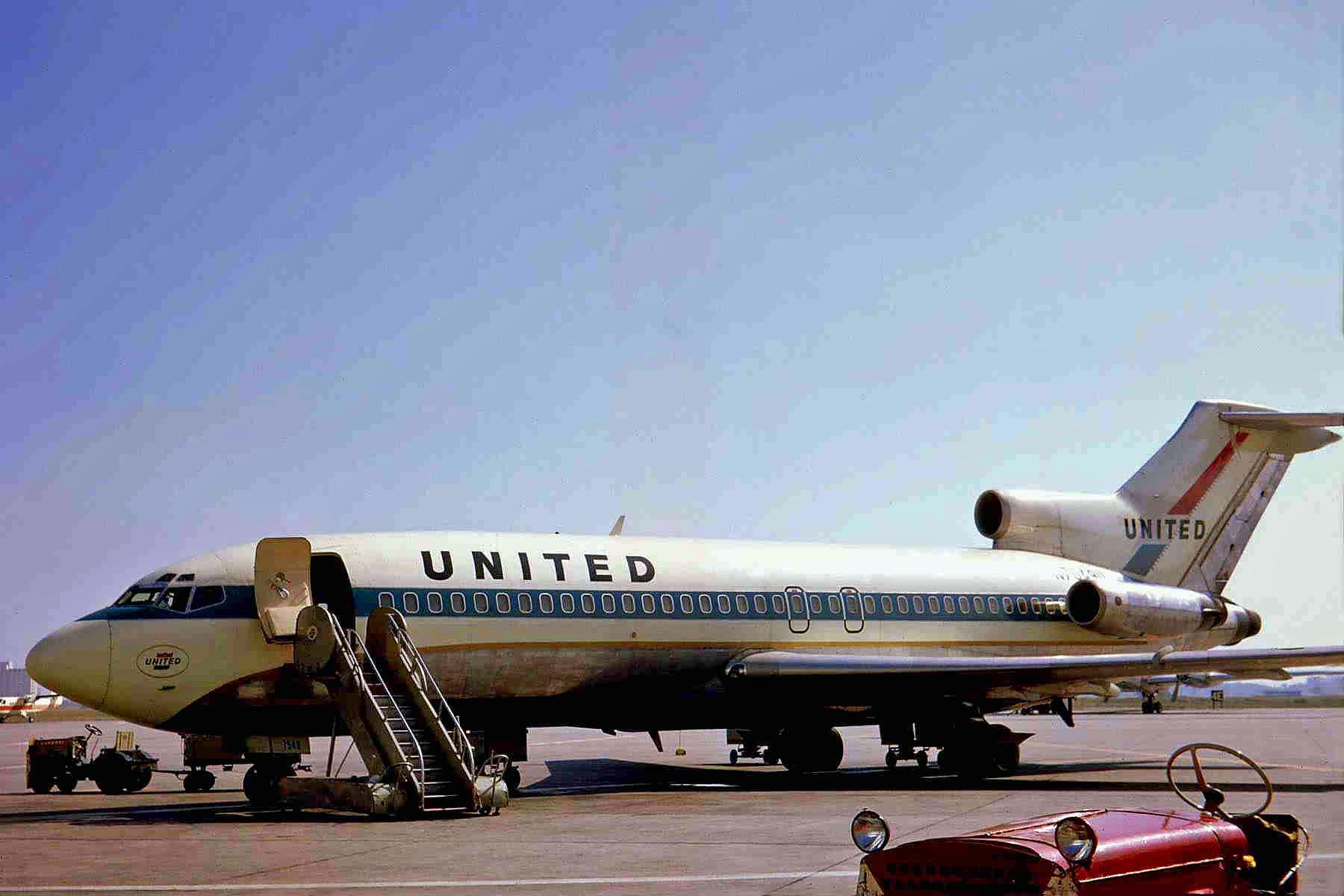
- The aircraft involved in 1969, while still operating with United Airlines

Accident
- Date: 23 May 1988
- Summary: Takeoff aborted due to aircraft control problems controlling pitch during rotation.
- Site: Juan Santamaría International Airport, San José, Costa Rica

Aircraft
- Aircraft type: Boeing 727-22
- Operator: Líneas Aéreas Costarricences
- Registration: TI-LRC
- Flight origin: Juan Santamaría International Airport, San José, Costa Rica
- Destination: Sandino International Airport, Managua, Nicaragua
- Occupants: 24
- Passengers: 16
- Crew: 8
- Fatalities: 0
- Survivors: 24

LACSA Flight 628 was a scheduled passenger flight operated by a Boeing 727-100 serving Líneas Aéreas Costarricences. On 23 May 1988, the aircraft crashed while attempting takeoff at Juan Santamaría International Airport in San José, Costa Rica. All 24 occupants on board survived the crash.

== Aircraft ==
The aircraft was a Boeing 727-100 (model 727-22) built in 1965, serial number 18856, registered TI-LRC and powered by three Pratt & Whitney JT8D-7B engines. The aircraft was delivered to Líneas Aéreas Costarricences (LACSA) in May 1987, and had accumulated 50,624 hours and 40,903 flight cycles before being decommissioned following the accident.

== Passengers and crew ==
On board were 16 passengers and 8 crew members: three pilots and five flight attendants. Captain Armando D'Ambrossio Morales, co-pilot Armando Rojas Aguilar, and flight engineer Héctor Araya Naranjo.

== Accident ==
The flight was scheduled to fly from Juan Santamaría International Airport in San José, Costa Rica to Augusto Sandino International Airport in Managua, Nicaragua. During takeoff on runway 7, the aircraft reached critical rotation speed (V1) and the captain initiated the takeoff maneuver, but the aircraft did not respond. The crew decided to abort the procedure and initiated an emergency braking maneuver. Unable to stop in the remaining distance of the runway, the aircraft overshot, crossed a ditch and stopped in a field, where it caught fire. All 24 occupants suffered minor injuries, while the aircraft was destroyed by the fire.

== Investigation ==
The Directorate General of Civil Aviation of Costa Rica was in charge of the investigations following the accident. The DGAC, in its final report,stated about the possible causes of the accident:

- The excess weight in the forward cargo hold shifted the center of gravity forward.
- Two additional trim units would have been required for takeoff.
- The aircraft did not respond correctly to the pilot's pitch input during the roll phase.
- This was caused by an incorrect adjustment of the aircraft's horizontal stabilizer.

=== Probable Cause ===
Excessive weight in the forward hold, combined with incorrect horizontal stabilizer trim that shifted the center of gravity forward and caused an improper trim setting, prevented the aircraft from responding as expected to pitch control during rotation.

== See also ==
- Delta Air Lines Flight 1141
- List of accidents and incidents involving the Boeing 727
