= Mungo, Angola =

Mungo
- Municipality and town
- Location in Angola
- Coordinates: 11°40′S 16°10′E
- Country: Angola
- Province: Huambo

Population (2014 Census)
  - Municipality and town: 113,417
  - Urban: 21,662
- Time zone: UTC+1 (WAT)

Mungo is a town and a municipality in the province of Huambo, Angola. The municipality had a population of 113,417 in 2014.
