= Chicala-Choloanga =

Chicala-Choloanga Tchicala Tcholohanga
- Municipality and town
- Location in Angola
- Coordinates: 12°37′59″S 16°2′45″E
- Country: Angola
- Province: Huambo

Population (2014 Census)
  - Total: 103,646
- Time zone: UTC+1 (WAT)

Chicala-Choloanga is a town and municipality in the province of Huambo, Angola.

It is 4380 km^{2} and has 103,646 inhabitants as of 2014. It is bordered to the north by the municipality of Bailundo, the east by the municipality of Catchiungo, the south by the municipality of Cuvango and Chipindo, and to the west by the city of Huambo. It comprises the communes of Mbave, Chicala-Choloanga, Sambo and Hungulo.
