= Chilata =

- Commune
- Country: Angola
- Province: Huambo

Area
  - Total: 342 sq mi (887 km^{2})

Population (2014)
  - Total: 27,398
  - Density: 80.0/sq mi (30.9/km^{2})
- Time zone: UTC+1 (WAT)
- Climate: Aw

Chilata is a commune of Angola, located in the province of Huambo.

== See also ==
- Communes of Angola
