= Huambo Airport =

Airport in Huambo, Angola

- IATA: none; ICAO: FNNL

Summary
- Airport type: Public
- Serves: Huambo
- Location: Angola
- Elevation AMSL: 5,443 ft / 1,659 m
- Coordinates: 12°47′10.7″S 15°46′28.3″E

Map
- Location of Huambo Airport in Angola

Runways
Direction	Length		Surface
Direction	m	ft	Surface
04/22	457	1,499	Dirt
- Source: Landings.com

Huambo Airport (ICAO: FNNL) is a public use airport near the eastern edge of the city of Huambo in Huambo Province, Angola.

In a May 2016 aerial image, the coordinates show a narrow dirt road over-arched in several places by trees.

The full-services Albano Machado Airport (IATA: NOV, ICAO: FNHU) is 2,500 metres (8,200 ft) south of the FNNL location.

== Accidents and incidents ==
On 19 January 2008, a Gira Globo Aeronáutica Beechcraft B200 Super King Air on approach to Huambo Airport crashed on a mountain near Bailundo, killing all 13 people on board.

== See also ==
- List of airports in Angola
- Transport in Angola
