= 1988 Talia Airways Boeing 727 crash =

Aircraft crash in Northern Cyprus in 1988

1988 Talia Airways/JAT Boeing 727 crash
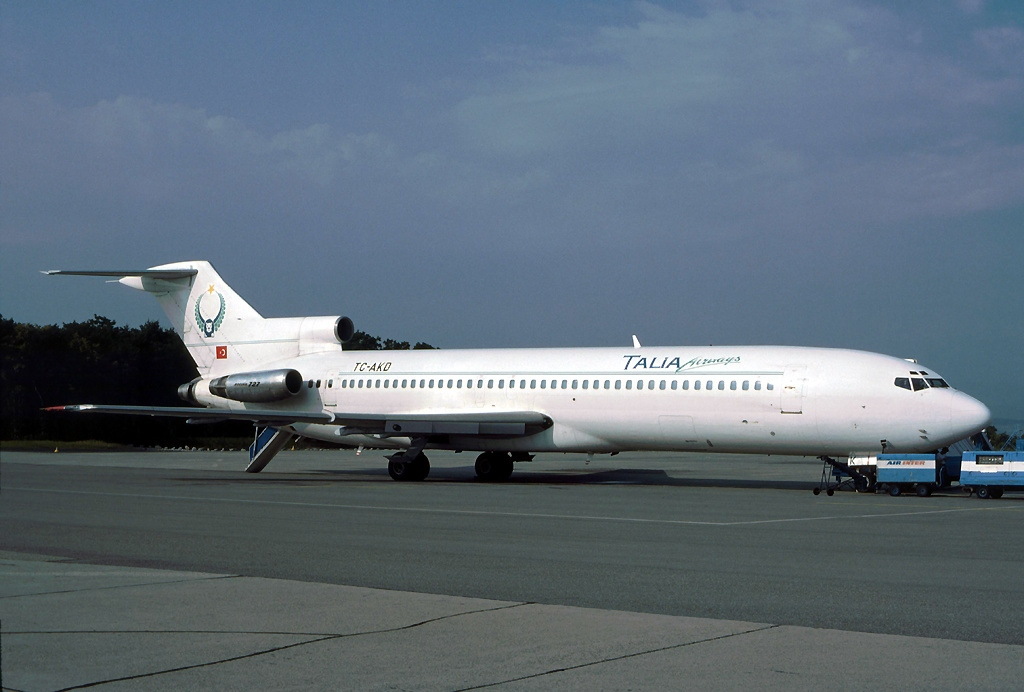
- TC-AKD, the aircraft involved in the accident, seen in 1987

Accident
- Date: 27 February 1988
- Summary: Controlled flight into terrain
- Site: Kornokipos, Cyprus Κορνόκηπος (Greek) Görneç (Turkish); 35.295°N 33.572°E

Aircraft
- Aircraft type: Boeing 727-200
- Operator: Talia Airways on behalf of JAT
- Registration: TC-AKD
- Flight origin: Istanbul Atatürk Airport
- Destination: Ercan Airport
- Occupants: 15
- Passengers: 2
- Crew: 13
- Fatalities: 15
- Survivors: 0

On 27 February 1988, a Talia Airways passenger flight operated by a Boeing 727-200 with registration TC-AKD on behalf of JAT, crashed into the Kyrenian mountain range on approach to Northern Cyprus on 27 February 1988. All 15 occupants on board the aircraft died in the crash and fire that followed.

== Flight and aircraft ==
The Talia Airways aircraft was on a flight from Istanbul's Atatürk Airport to Ercan International Airport in Northern Cyprus. It was running a near-empty flight to collect 160 passengers to transport them back to Finland. The airframe was a Boeing 727-200 which had been built in 1974. The flight was lightly loaded with thirteen crew and two passengers, all of whom died in the crash. Seven of the crew were Yugoslavian, two of the stewardesses were British, and the rest of the crew were from Turkey. The two passengers were a senior manager at Talia Airways and his wife. The aircraft belonged to a Yugoslavian airline company (JAT), and was on hire to Talia Airways.

== Accident ==
As the flight approached Cyprus from the north, air traffic control informed the pilot to approach using the VOR at 6,000 feet (1,800 m), but the pilot descended the aircraft to 2,000 feet (610 m). The descent took them below the Girne Arap mountain range, which peaks at (3,130 feet (950 m)). At this point, the aircraft was 15 miles (24 km) from the airfield at Ercan. When the pilot saw the peak in front of him he tried to turn left, but the aircraft crashed into the mountain with the rear of the plane being wrecked on the northern side of the mountain, and the forward part being wrecked on the southern side. The aircraft crashed at 10:20 am (local time), barely ten minutes before it was due to land.

When the rescue services arrived on the scene, they noted wreckage strewn over large area and charred bodies. Sources vary on the breakdown of the occupants on board, however, it is agreed that 15 people died, all of whom were on the aircraft. No one on the ground was injured or died. The bodies of the stewardesses were so badly charred that identification was very difficult, and resulted in the wrong bodies being sent to the families.

A five-member team from the Turkish Transport Ministry flew to Northern Cyprus the day after the crash to investigate.

== Aftermath ==
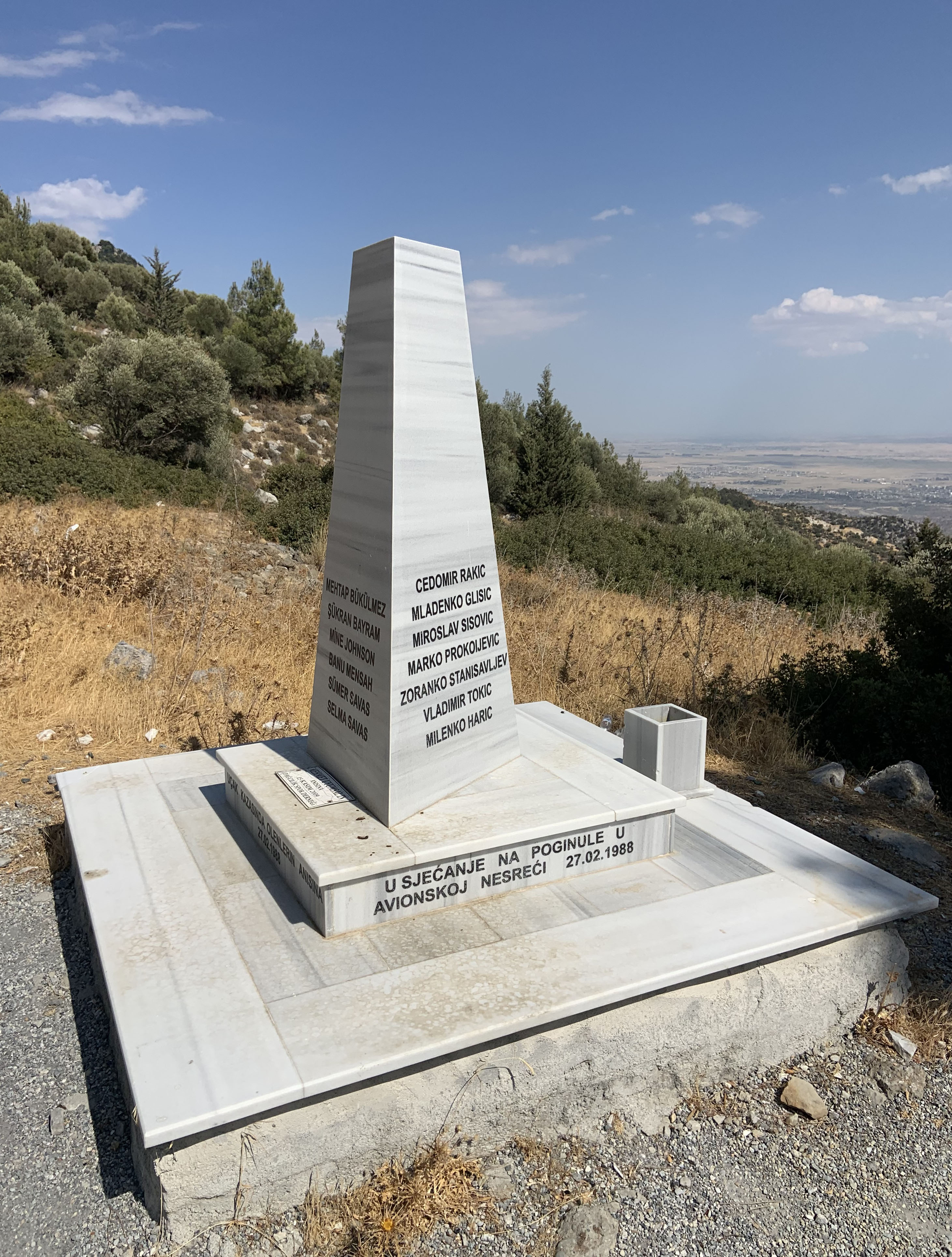
Monument to victims of the crash, situated near Buffavento Castle

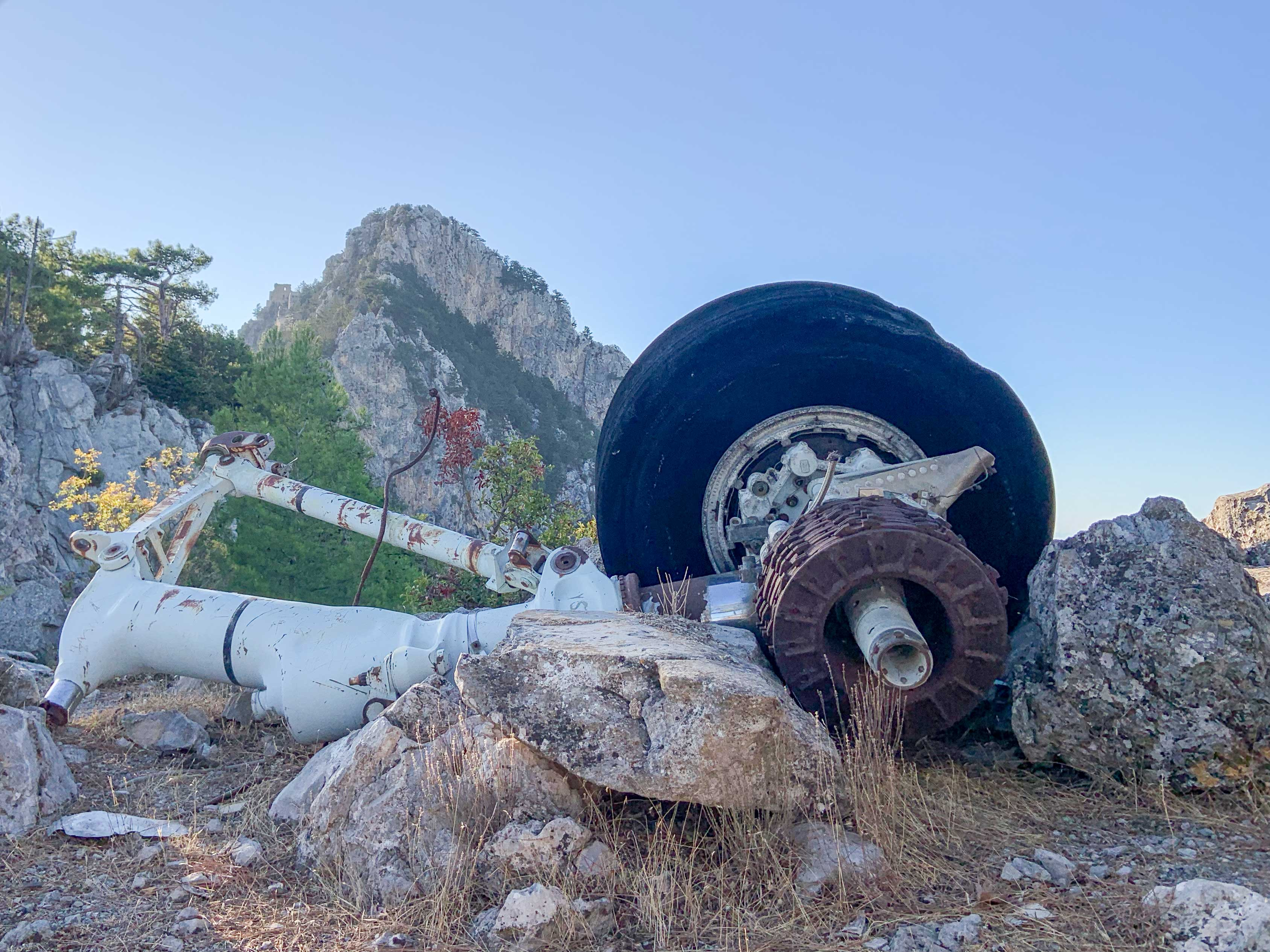
Undercarriage

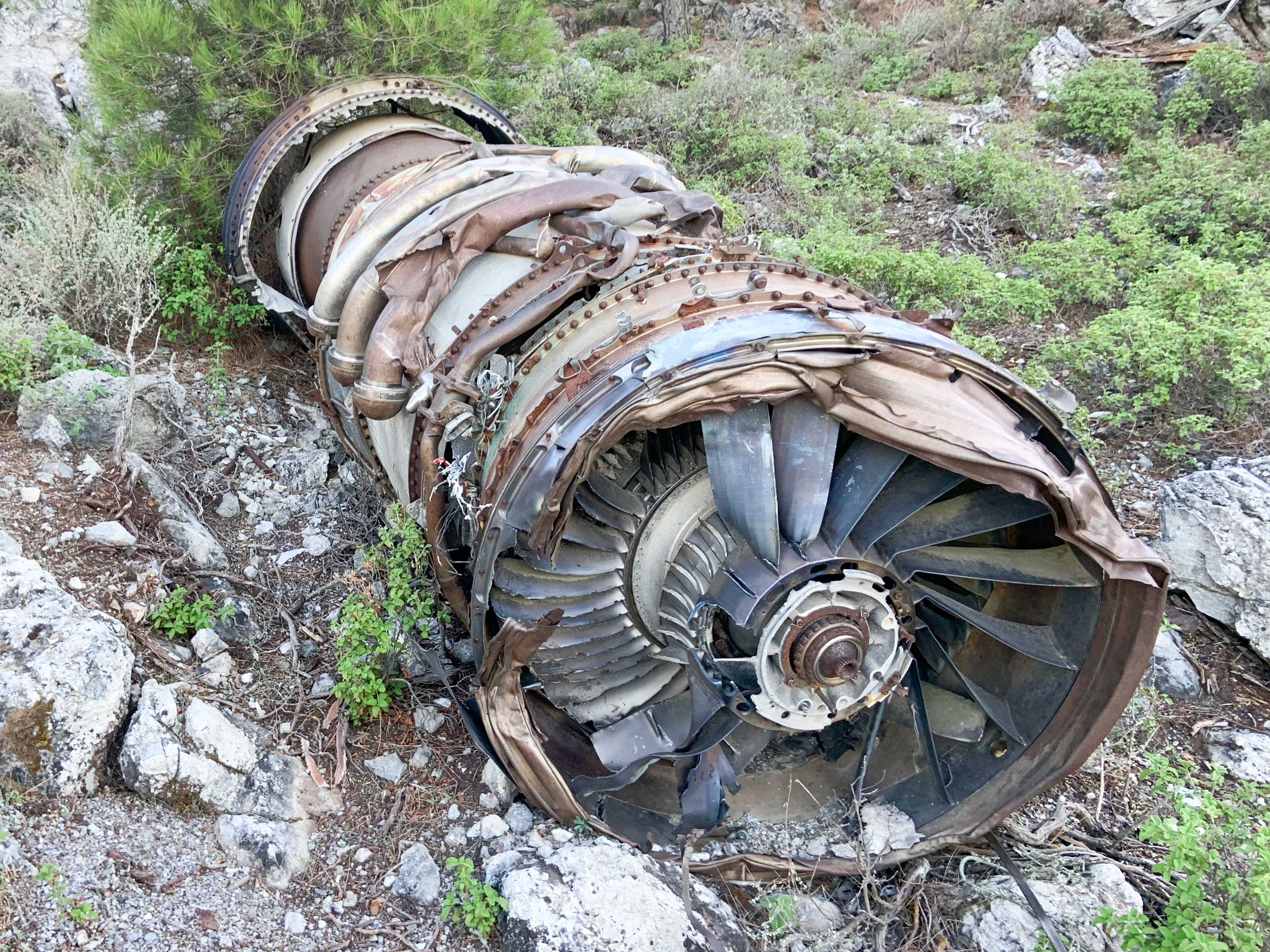
Engine

A separate inquiry was held into the death of the two British personnel, in June 1988. Much of the wreckage was left at the crash site, and still lies there in the 21st century.
