= Aeronáutica (Angola) =

Airline of Angola

IATA	ICAO	Call sign
-	GGL	GIRA GLOBO
- Founded: 2001
- Ceased operations: 2018
- Hubs: Quatro de Fevereiro Airport
- Fleet size: 3
- Parent company: Gira Globo Limitada
- Headquarters: Luanda, Angola

Aeronáutica (also known as Gira Globo Aeronáutica after its parent company) was an airline based in Luanda, Angola, operating domestic chartered freight and passenger flights out of Quatro de Fevereiro Airport, Luanda.

== History ==
The airline was established in 2001 and is wholly owned by GVA-Investimentos, SARL. Due to safety concerns, the company (along with all other Angolan airlines, except TAAG) has been banned from operating within the European Union. Meanwhile, the airline ceased operations.

== Fleet ==
The Aeronáutica fleet included the following aircraft (at March 2007):

- 1 Antonov An-32
- 1 Raytheon Beech King Air 200
- 1 Raytheon Beech King Air B200
- 1 Ilyushin Il-76

== Accidents and incidents ==
- 19 January 2008: A Beech Super King Air (D2-FFK) of Gira Globo crashed on approach to Huambo Airport. All 13 on board were killed.
