= Mexicana de Aviación Flight 801 =

1969 aviation accident in Mexico

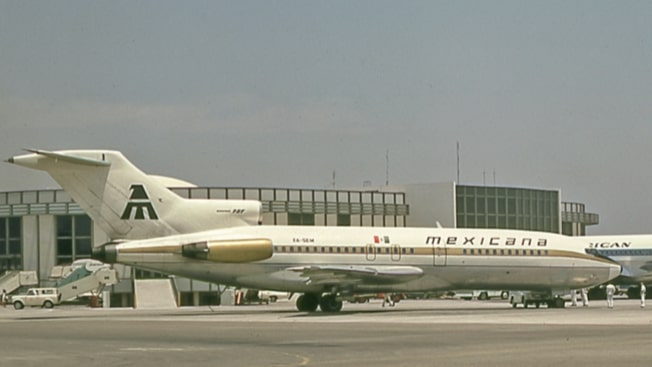
- A Mexicana Boeing 727-100, similar to the aircraft involved

Accident
- Date: September 21, 1969
- Summary: Crashed during final approach for undetermined reasons
- Site: Mexico City

Aircraft
- Aircraft type: Boeing 727-100
- Aircraft name: Azteca de Oro
- Operator: Mexicana de Aviación
- Call sign: MEXICANA 801
- Registration: XA-SEJ
- Flight origin: Chicago-O'Hare International Airport, United States
- Destination: Mexico City International Airport, Mexico
- Occupants: 118
- Passengers: 111
- Crew: 7
- Fatalities: 27
- Survivors: 91

Mexicana de Aviación Flight 801 was a scheduled international flight from Chicago-O'Hare International Airport in Illinois bound for Mexico City International Airport, Mexico City. On September 21, 1969, the Boeing 727-100 crashed during its final approach to Mexico City International Airport. The aircraft broke apart upon impact, killing 27 of the 118 occupants on board. The cause of the crash was never determined.

== Aircraft and flight ==
The Boeing 727-100 aircraft which operated Flight 801 was manufactured in 1966 and delivered to Mexicana de Aviación. It bore the registration XA-SEJ and was powered by three Pratt & Whitney JT8D-7B engines. The ill-fated flight originated from Chicago-O'Hare International Airport in the United States, carrying 111 passengers and 7 flight crew members. There were three pilots, namely Captain Roberto Urías and officers Luis Franco Espinosa and Luis Guillot. Flight 801 was scheduled to arrive at Mexico City International Airport. Most of the passengers were American tourists heading for Mexico City or Acapulco. The aircraft was deemed not airworthy because the Flight Data Recorder was improperly installed by technicians two days prior to the crash, and the Cockpit Voice Recorder was removed and not replaced.

== Accident ==
Flight 801 was given clearance for an instrument landing on Runway 23L. It was in the landing configuration; Undercarriage down, flaps extended 30 degrees, leading-edge slats activated and stabilizer raised nose up by 10.25 units. On its final approach, at 17:45, the aircraft suddenly lost altitude and impacted the ground about 1,500 m (4,900 ft) from the runway threshold. This caused the aircraft to become airborne until the landing gears and front body impacted a railroad embankment. It crashed into a swamp and broke into three pieces. Dozens of passengers were reportedly sucked out of the airframe as it broke apart, scattering them for over 300 m (980 ft). One of the engines also detached from the airframe. There was no post-crash fire. The forward section and cockpit came to rest 300 m (980 ft) away from the main fuselage wreckage.

== Aftermath ==
Locals began looting passengers' belongings while they were trapped among the wreck. Many were trapped for hours before being rescued. The swamp environment made rescuing people and recovering bodies difficult. All three pilots and five flight attendants were killed; Captain Roberto Urías was reportedly still alive in the cockpit after the crash. Fifty-three people were hospitalised while five had serious injuries.

Rescue work was hindered by mud and water hence locals used boats from Lake San Juan de Aragón to reach the crash site. A 35-year-old American was airlifted to hospital after 60 people helped move the plane's wing to free him. President Gustavo Díaz Ordaz demanded medical assistance for the injured. The Secretariat of National Defense also deployed guards to prevent further looting. The crash site became a local interest point as many residents gathered to watch the ongoing rescue efforts from afar. Some street vendors also appeared along roadsides. An airport catering company provided rescue workers with sustenance. Several workers were injured by wreckage parts.

A flight attendant who survived the crash, Graciela Flores, later died in another plane crash. On March 31, 1986, Flores flew as a retired flight attendant with her children and husband, Captain Carlos Alberto Guadarrama Sixtos, on Mexicana de Aviación Flight 940. The flight with 166 on board crashed, killing everyone on board.
