= Cacoma =

Coordinates: 10°57′S 17°53′E

- Commune
- Location in Angola
- Country: Angola
- Province: Huambo
- Time zone: UTC+1 (WAT)
- Climate: Aw

Cacoma is a town and commune of Angola, located in the province of Huambo.

== See also ==
- Communes of Angola
