= Lépi =

Coordinates: 12°52′S 15°24′E

Lepi
- Commune
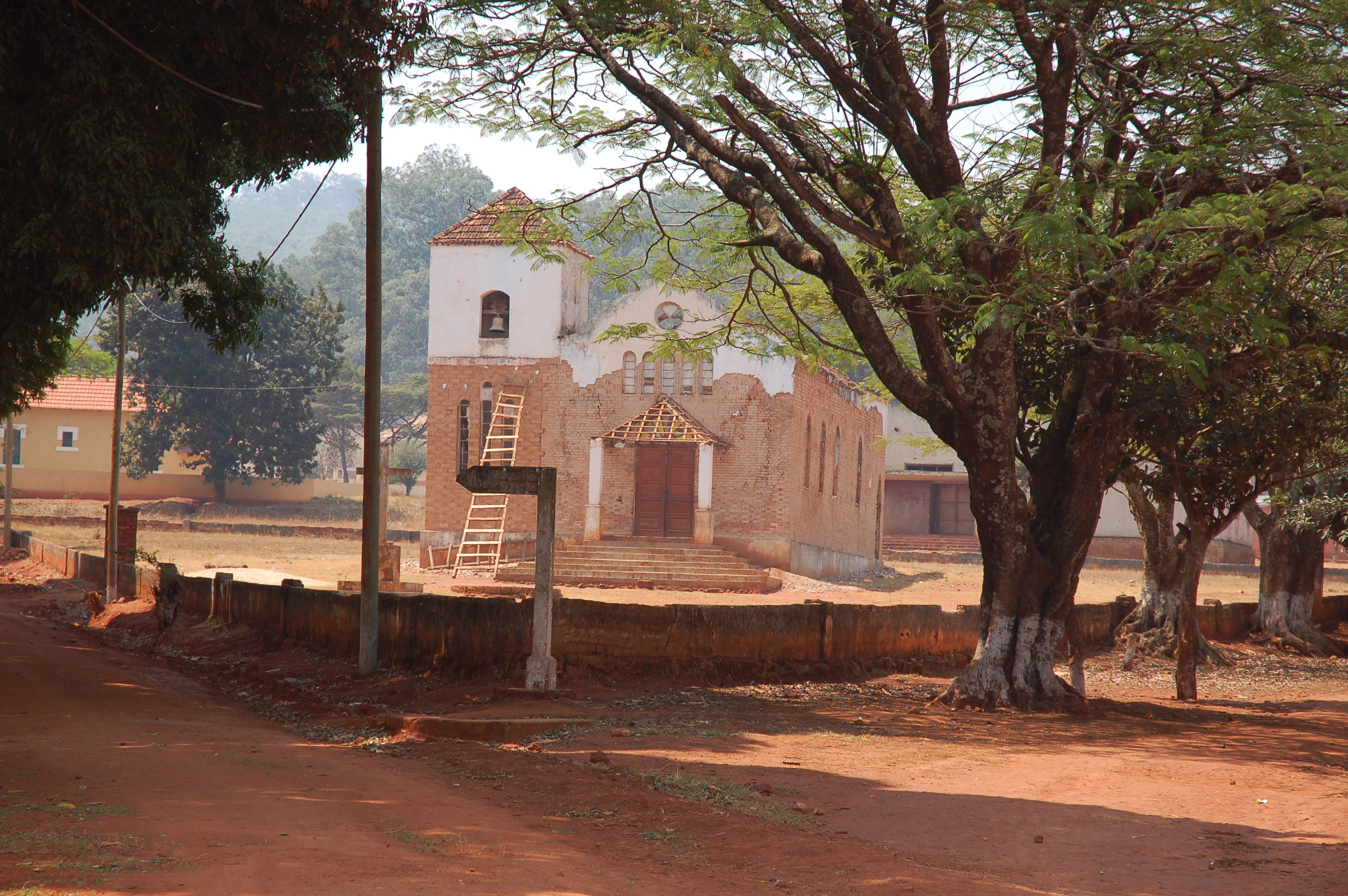
- Reconstruction of a church in Lepi, 2007

- Location in Angola
- Country: Angola
- Province: Huambo

Area
  - Total: 164 sq mi (426 km^{2})

Population (2014)
  - Total: 23,074
  - Density: 140/sq mi (54.2/km^{2})
- Time zone: UTC+1 (WAT)
- Climate: Aw

Lepi is a commune of Angola, located in the province of Huambo.

== See also ==
- Communes of Angola
