= Huambo Province =

Province of Angola

Coordinates: 12°30′S 15°40′E

Huambo
- Province
- Huambo, province of Angola
- Country: Angola
- Capital: Huambo

Government
  - Governor: Pereira Alfredo
  - Vice-Governor for the Political, Economical and Social Sector: Angelino Edmundo Elavoco
  - Vice-Governor for Technical Services and Infrastructures: Edgar Marcelino dos Santos Hilario

Area
  - Total: 34,270 km^{2} (13,230 sq mi)

Population (2024 census)
  - Total: 2,691,902
  - Density: 78.55/km^{2} (203.4/sq mi)
- ISO 3166 code: AO-HUA
- HDI (2018): 0.526 low · 11th
- Website: www.huambo.gov.ao

Huambo is a province of Angola. With an area of 34,270 km^{2}, it is one of the geographically smaller provinces, situated in the Central Region approximately 450 km south east of the capital, Luanda.

The province had a population of 2,019,555 according to the 2014 census, of which 48% are in urban areas. At the 2024 census, the population had grown to 2,691,902.

== Terrain and climate ==
The foundation of the Central Plateau is a vast slab of primeval crystalline rock that frequently outcrops in the form of isolated rocks or massive peaks. The most prominent peak in the province is Mt. Môco in Londuimbali, with 2,620 metres. The peak is the highest point in Angola. The headwaters of the Kunene River rise on the Central Plateau near Huambo town. Much of the soil in Huambo Province is of poor quality, and has been impoverished in many areas by overuse and erosion. However, it is generally of better quality than in the adjoining regions to the east, north and south.

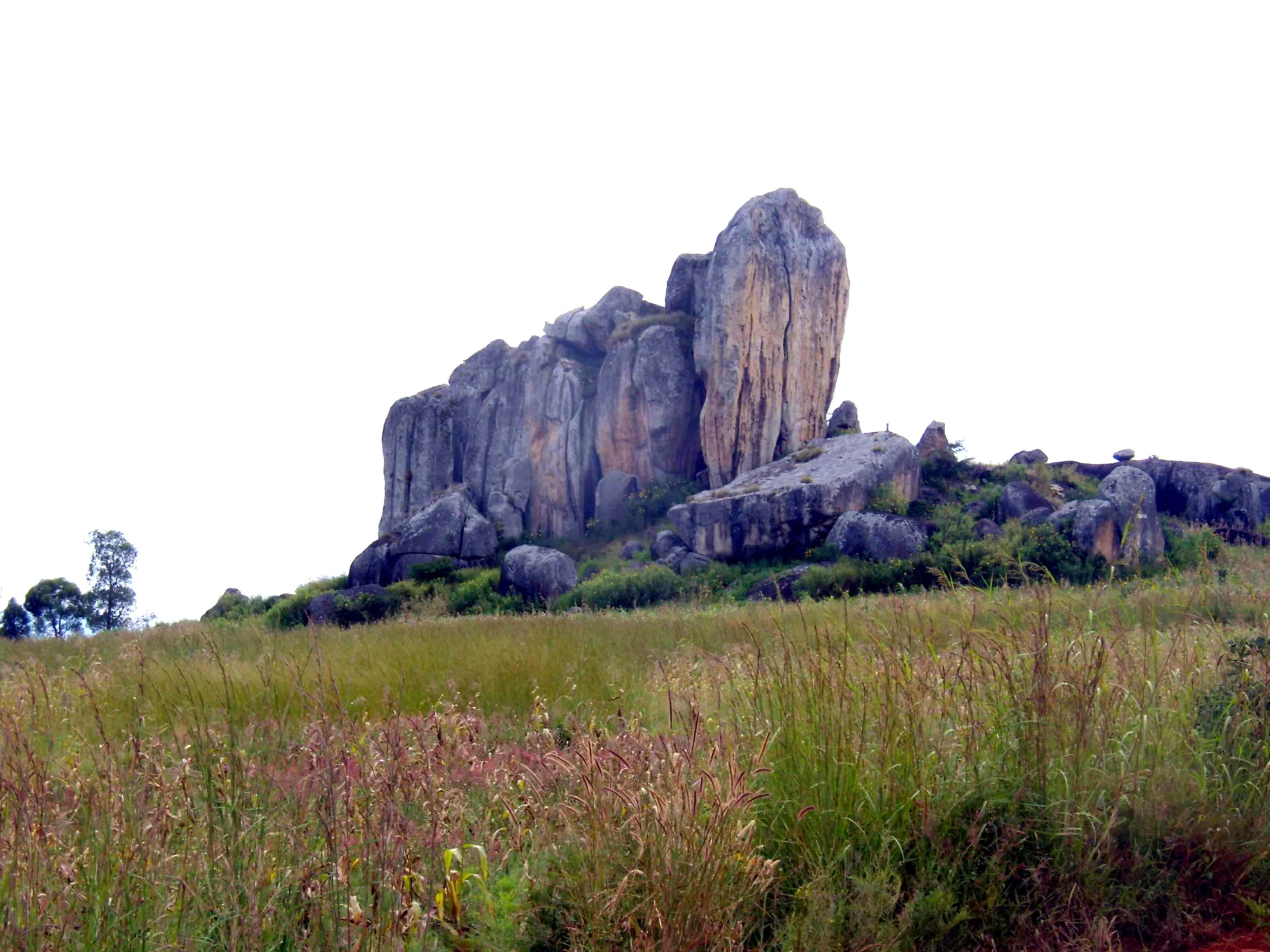
Pedra do Alemão

Striking differences can be observed between the vegetation of the highlands and the lower zone towards the coast. One characteristic feature of the coastal area is the baobab (Adansonia Digitata, or imbondeiro, in Portuguese). Tropical forests can also be found in the areas that receive significant rainfall. Until recently, the highlands were covered with a variety of trees; today, however, except in isolated areas in Bailundo and other regions, grasslands have taken the place of forest and woodland. Traditional methods of agriculture, slash-and-burn techniques (queimadas) and overpopulation by large concentrations of people displaced from their homes during the war (1975–2002) have caused significant deforestation. The use of wood fuel for the Benguela Railway until the 1980s was also responsible for deforestation. Large extensions of native forest have been cut down and replaced by rapid-growing and soil-depleting eucalyptus and pine trees.

The Central Plateau is well within the tropical zone, but altitude and the effect of the southwestern Antarctic current combine to produce a moderate climate. The annual variation of temperature is small, with maximum temperatures varying between 17 and 28 °C during much of the year. The average maximum is approximately 22 °C. During the winter months (May–July), temperatures may reach as low as 5 to 8 °C. Mean annual rainfall varies from 800 to 1600 mm, according to region. In the Central Plateau, seasonal rains begin with a few showers during September, increase during October and November, have a break of two to four weeks in December, January or February, and continue until the end of April. The heaviest rainfall is usually in November or December.

== Demography ==
The Province of Huambo has an area of 35,771.15 km^{2}. It is divided into 11 municipalities that are sub-divided into 37 communes. It borders the Province of Kuanza Sul to the northwest, Bie to the north and east, Benguela to the west, and Huila to the south. According to the Provincial Department of Statistics and Planning, Huambo is a relatively populated province with 1,948,000 people (approximately 15% of the estimated national of 12.6 million). More than half, 55%, of the population is urbanized, concentrated in Huambo City (822,000 people) and Caála Municipality (239,000 people). Recent population movements towards the native rural areas and functional deficiencies of the Civil Administration make difficult to accurately estimate population figures. The Huambo Provincial Department of Statistics and Planning reports that 419,000, or approximately 22% of the population, are children under five years of age.

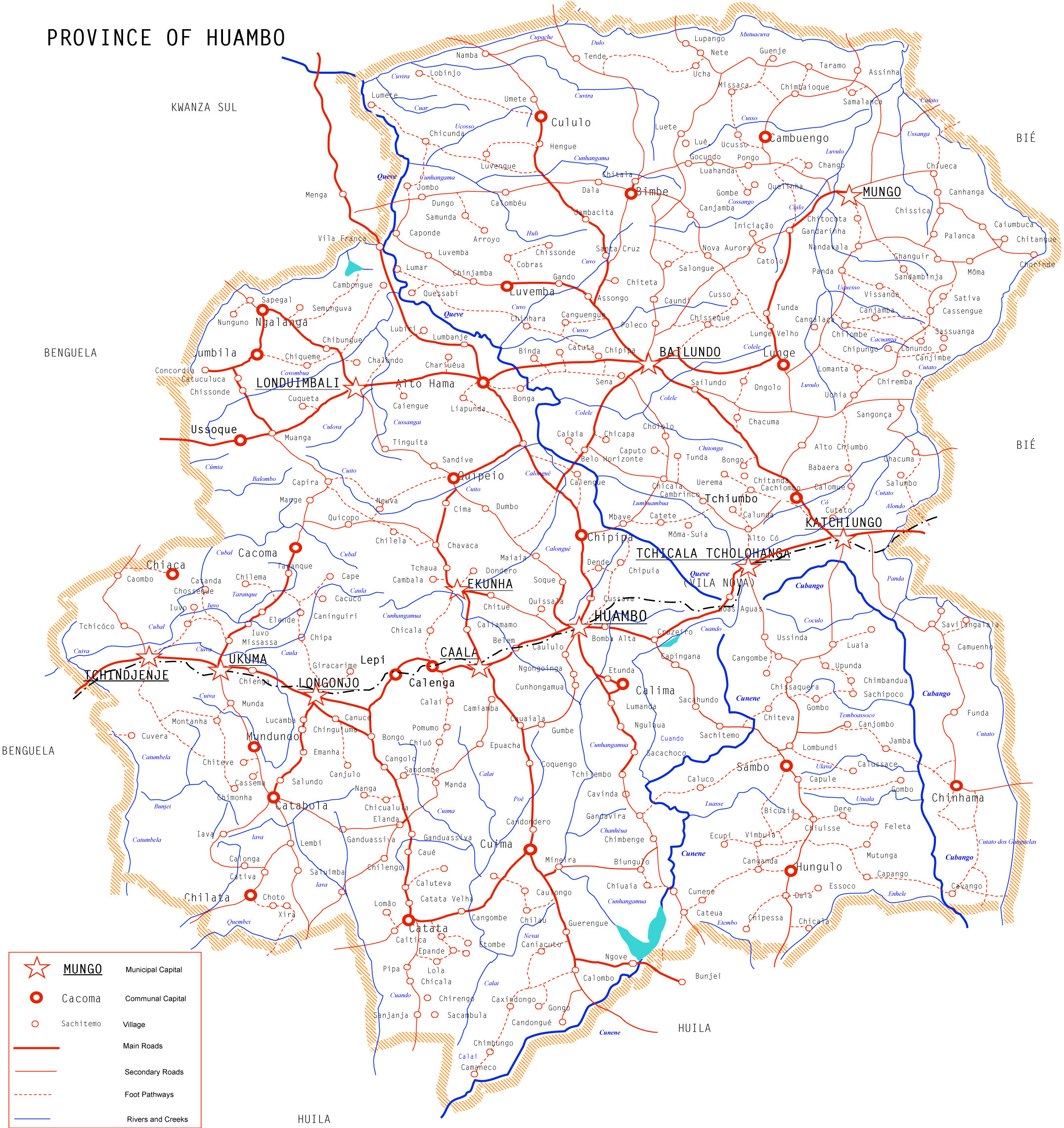
Map of the Huambo Province

- Municipality: Bailundo:
  - Commune: Bailundo: 106 villages, 838 km^{2}
  - Commune: Bimbe (M'Bimbi): 194 villages, 1,004 km^{2}
  - Commune: Hengue-Caculo: 123 villages, 1,510 km^{2}
  - Commune: Lunge: ?? villages, ??? km^{2}
  - Commune: Luvemba: 214 villages, 2,163 km^{2}
- Municipality: Caála:
  - Commune: Caála: 90 villages, 729 km^{2}
  - Commune: Calenga: 52 villages, 389 km^{2}
  - Commune: Catata: 74 villages, 1,090 km^{2}
  - Commune: Cuíma: 116 villages, 1,472 km^{2}
- Municipality: Ekunha (Ecunha):
  - Commune: Ecunha: 80 villages, 797 km^{2}
  - Commune: Quipeio: 67 villages, 880 km^{2}
- Municipality: Huambo:
  - Commune: Huambo: 164 villages, 668 km^{2}
  - Commune: Calima: 61 villages, 1,348 km^{2}
  - Commune: Chipipa (Tchipipa): 63 villages, 593 km^{2}
- Municipality: Katchiungo (Catchiungo):
  - Commune: Catchiungo: 66 villages, 645 km^{2}
  - Commune: Chinhama: 51 villages, 1,445 km^{2}
  - Commune: Chiumbo: 82 villages, 857 km^{2}
- Municipality: Londuimbali (Londuimbale):
  - Commune: Londuimbali: 71 villages, 589 km^{2}
  - Commune: Alto–Hama: 69 villages, 781 km^{2}
  - Commune: Cumbila (Kumbila): 34 villages, 305 km^{2}
  - Commune: Ngalanga (Galanga): 66 villages, 608 km^{2}
  - Commune: Ussoque: 25 villages, 415 km^{2}
- Municipality: Longonjo:
  - Commune: Longonjo: 60 villages, 790 km^{2}
  - Commune: Chilata: 57 villages, 880 km^{2}
  - Commune: Iava: 36 villages, 585 km^{2}
  - Commune: Lépi: 57 villages 660 km^{2}
- Municipality: Mungo:
  - Commune: Mungo: 139 villages, 3,500 km^{2}
  - Commune: Cambuengo: 127 villages, 1,900 km^{2}
- Municipality: Tchicala Tcholoanga (Chicala-Choloanga):
  - Commune: Chicala-Choloanga: 93 villages, 1,025 km^{2}
  - Commune: Mbave: ?? villages, ??? km^{2}
  - Commune: Sambo: 177 villages, 1,450 km^{2}
  - Commune: Samboto: 87 villages, 1,300 km^{2}
- Municipality: Tchinjenje (Chinjenje):
  - Commune: Chinjenje: 54 villages, 500 km^{2}
  - Commune: Chiaca: 57 villages, 300 km^{2}
- Municipality: Ukuma (Ucuma):
  - Commune: Ucuma: 97 villages, 750 km^{2}
  - Commune: Cacoma: 82 villages, 500 km^{2}
  - Commune: Mundundo: 55 villages, 350 km^{2}

Source : Ministry of Planning, 2003

== Government ==
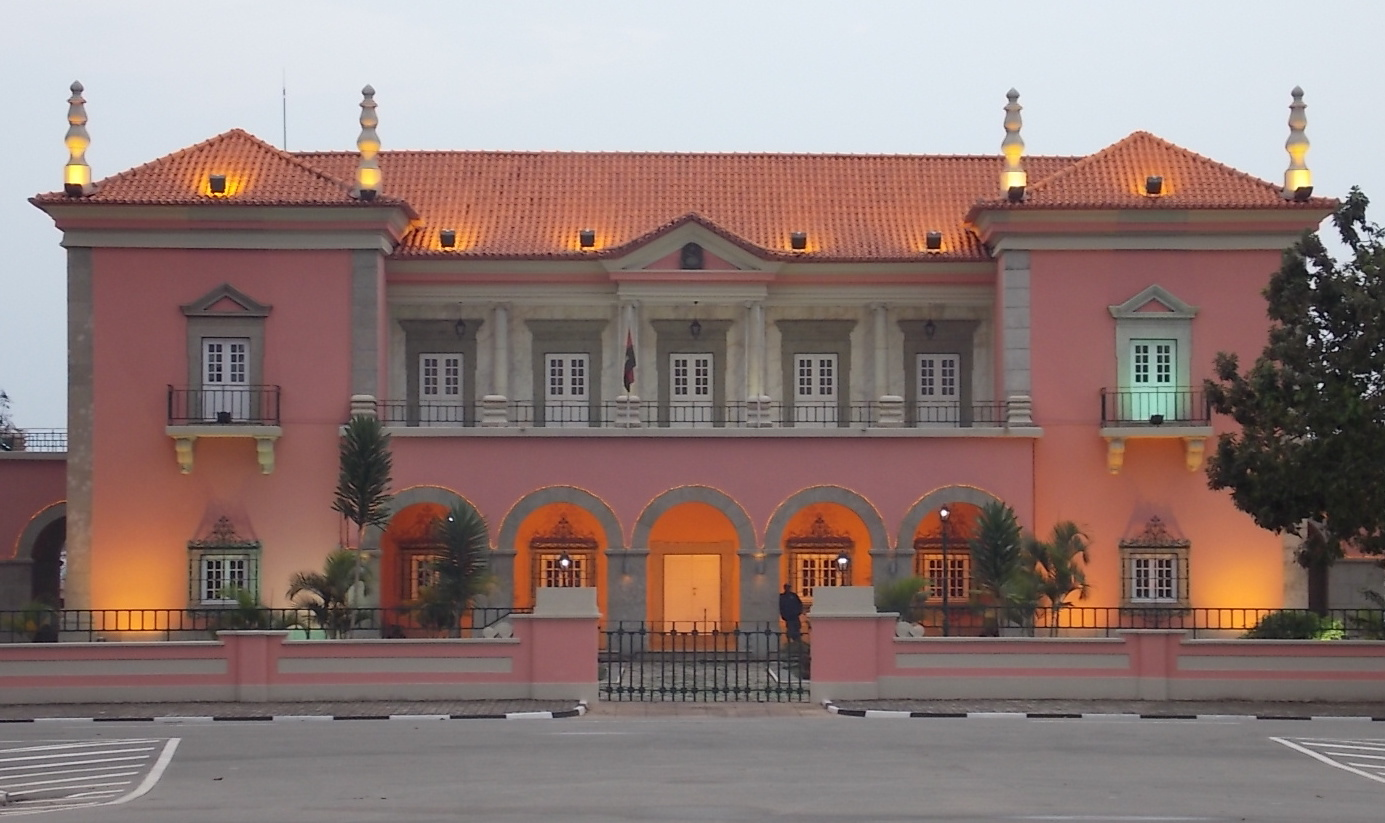
Governor's Palace, Huambo

The province is headed by a Governor, currently Faustino Muteka, assisted by two vice-governors (Social and Economical Affairs). The central Government is represented also by 3 Delegates who report to their Ministry and to the Governor: Finance, Justice and Interior. The rest of Ministerial Delegations became Directorates after a reform introduced in June 1998: Health, Education, Energy and Water, Urbanism, Agriculture, Social Assistance, strengthening thus even more the power of the Governor to whom they report. All 11 Municipalities are headed by the civilian Administrators, under whom come 35 Communal Administrators. These have their own politically appointed Regedores (textually, Rulers) and the traditional leaders, the Sobas, who have lost much of their ancestral significance in the decision – making process.

== Transport ==
Two trans-African automobile routes intersect in Huambo:

- Tripoli-Cape Town Highway
- Beira-Lobito Highway

== Agriculture and food security ==
Huambo is the richest agricultural province in Angola. In 1999 the Province produced almost 22% of total national cereal production: 115,000 t out of a total of 530,000 t. As a result of improved security, areas used for cultivation in the Province have increased during the past years to about 500 km^{2}. This represents the largest increase in the country since the end of the war.

The principal cereal crop is maize with 1950 km^{2} under cultivation. Yields are low, only 40 t/km^{2}, compared with yields of between 50 and 120 t/km^{2} in other provinces. The second cereal crop is millet/sorghum with approximately 160 km^{2} under production. Grain production has increased significantly in recent years. Total output rose to a peak of 159,000 t in the 1997/1998 season compared to only 17,000 t in 1993/1994. Climate and pest conditions forced production back to 115,000 t in 1998/1999 and to an estimated 88,000 t in 1999/2000. Other crops produced in the province include beans (450 km^{2}) and manioc (415 km^{2}), sweet potatoes (95 km^{2}) and Irish potatoes (32 km^{2}). Coffee (Arabica type) used to be a significant produce of Huambo thanks to the favourable altitude and weather conditions of the Province, and is currently being reintroduced as the main crop in many farms of the region.

== Health and nutrition ==
Approximately 25 basic health facilities are operational within the Province, run by the Government or humanitarian agencies, covering 547,500 people in Huambo city and the municipality of Caála. According to the World Health Organization and the Ministry of Health, this represents an average of one facility per 20,778 people, close to the Angolan average of one health unit per 20,000 people. In Huambo, one health unit serves 18,000 people while in Caála, one unit covers 33,000 people. The provincial hospital is based in Huambo city.

Vaccination coverage in Huambo city is higher than in other municipalities. In Huambo city, 16 vaccination posts cover 89,800 children under five years of age (one post per 5,600 children). In Caála, two posts cover 19,700 children (2002).

== Education ==
Approximately 40 primary and three secondary schools operate in Huambo city (2001). Five schools target displaced children. In Caála, seven schools target displaced children.

== Water and sanitation ==
In Huambo, the main water treatment plant has not functioned properly since 1975 and the 400 km of water pipes are in poor condition. The population is currently dependent on wells for water access. During recent years, considerable work in the sector was undertaken by the Government and humanitarian agencies, including construction of 550 family latrines and 25 wells in villages and communities.

== Mines ==
The number of mines and unexploded ordnance (UXO) in the Province is unknown. An average of eight mine accidents per month are reported. Mine accident statistics are gathered by humanitarian agencies through Huambo Central Hospital where all mine-related injuries are referred. Demining activities happen throughout the Province and are currently being implemented by an International NGO. Other humanitarian institutions provide ongoing mine awareness programmes. During the year 2002, 145,000 people participated in these programmes. Mine awareness activities include theatre and puppet shows as well as exhibitions in schools and internally displaced people camps. Additionally, ten-minute radio programmes on the dangers of mines are broadcast two times per week.

== List of governors ==
Name	Years in office
Pedro Maria Tonha Pedalé	1976–1979
Lt.Col. Santana André Pitra	1979–1982
Lt.Col. João Ernesto dos Santos Liberdade	1982–1986
Lt.Col. Marques Manukapui Bassovava	1986–1987
Marcolino José Carlos Moco	1987–1989
Osvaldo de Jesus Serra Van-Dúnem	1989–1992
Graciano Mande	1992
Baltazar Manuel	1992–1997
António Paulo Kassoma	1997–2008
Albino Malungo	2008–2009
Fernando Faustino Muteka	2009–2014
Kundi Paihama	2014–2016
João Baptista Kussumua	2016–2018
Joana Lina	2018–2020
Lotti Nolika	2020–

Up to 1991, the official name was Provincial Commissioner

== Notable natives ==
- Georges Rebelo Chicoti, current Minister of Foreign Affairs
- Paulo Kassoma, former Huambo Governor
- José Eduardo Agualusa, writer
- Sousa Jamba, writer
