= Outline of Angola =

Country in southern Africa

The Flag of Angola

The Emblem of Angola

The location of Angola

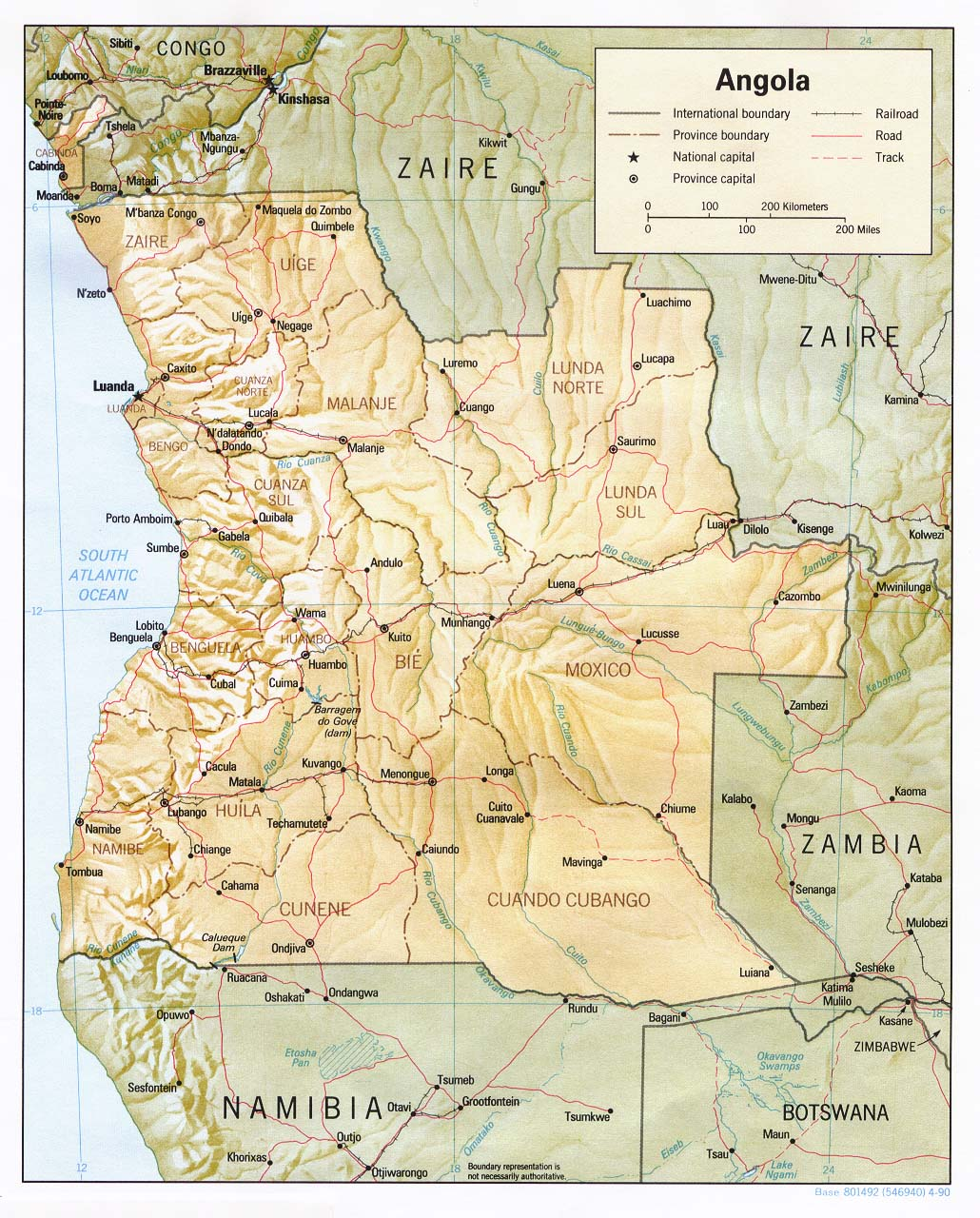
An enlargeable relief map of the Republic of Angola

The following outline is provided as an overview of and topical guide to Angola:

Angola – country in southern Africa bordered by Namibia on the south, the Democratic Republic of the Congo on the north, and Zambia on the east; its west coast is on the Atlantic Ocean with Luanda as its capital city. The exclave province of Cabinda has borders with the Republic of the Congo and the Democratic Republic of the Congo. The country has vast mineral and petroleum reserves, and its economy has on average grown at a two-digit pace since the 1990s, especially since the end of the civil war. In spite of this, standards of living remain low, and life expectancy and infant mortality rates in Angola are among the worst-ranked in the world.

== General reference ==
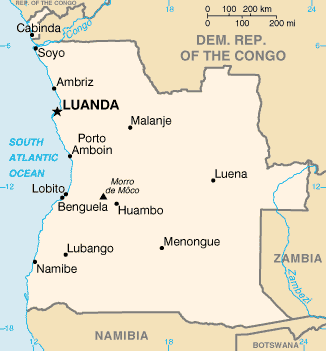
An enlargeable basic map of Angola

- Pronunciation: /ænˈɡoʊlə/
- Common English country name: Angola
- Official English country name: The Republic of Angola
- Common endonym(s): A
- Official endonym(s): A
- Adjectival(s): Angolan
- Demonym(s): Angolans
- International rankings of Angola
- ISO country codes: AO, AGO, 024
- ISO region codes: See ISO 3166-2:AO
- Internet country code top-level domain: .ao

== Geography of Angola ==
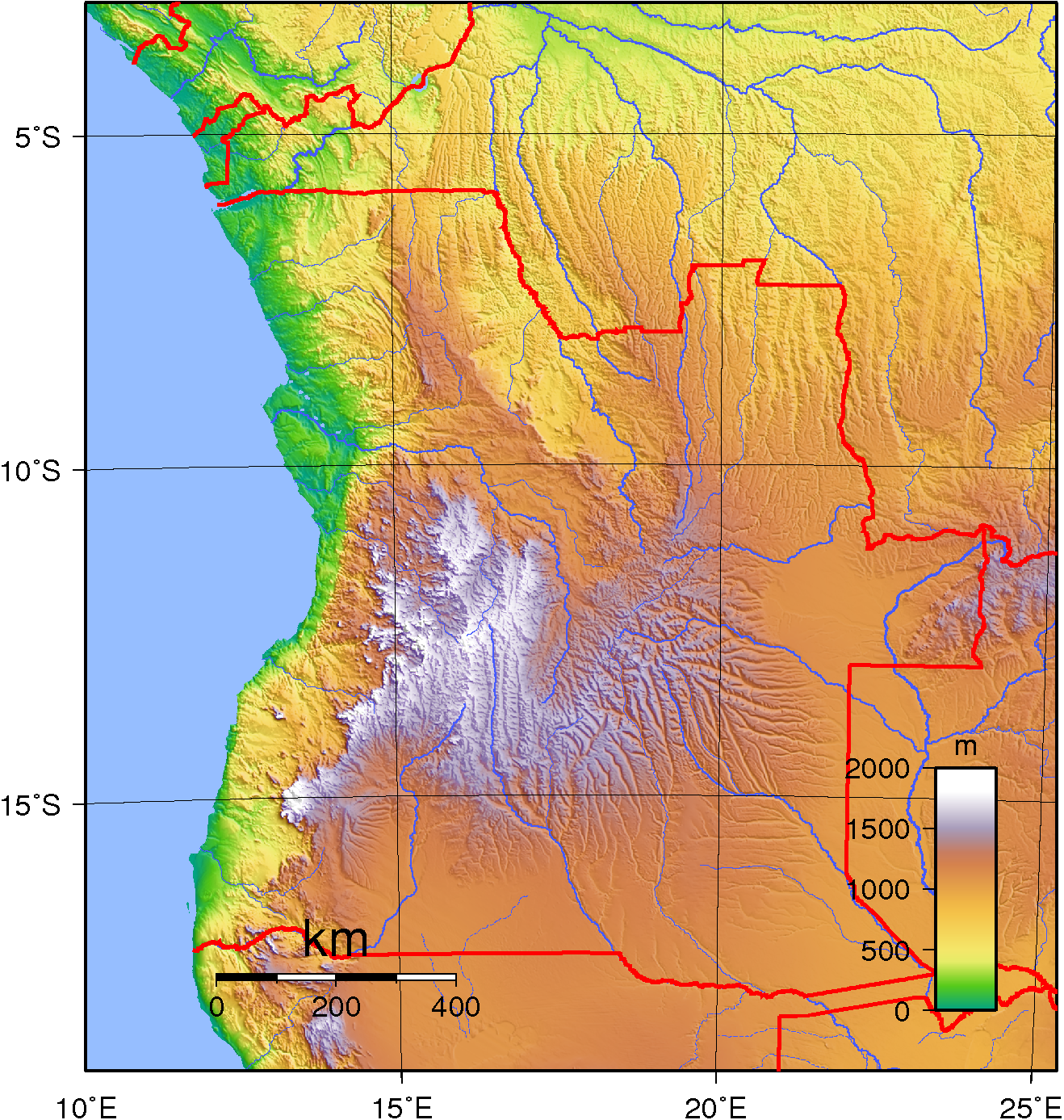
An enlargeable topographic map of Angola

- Angola is: a country
- Population of Angola: 33,086,278 people - 42nd most populous country
- Area of Angola: 1,246,700 km^{2} - 23rd largest country
- Atlas of Angola

=== Location ===
Angola lies in Southern Africa, bordering the South Atlantic Ocean, between Namibia and the Democratic Republic of the Congo.

- Angola is situated within the following regions:
  - Eastern Hemisphere and Southern Hemisphere
  - Africa
    - Middle Africa
    - Southern Africa
- Time zone: West Africa Time (UTC+01)
- Extreme points of Angola
  - High: Morro de Môco 2,620 m (8,596 ft)
  - Low: South Atlantic Ocean 0 m
- Land boundaries: 5,198 km

Democratic Republic of the Congo 2,511 km
Namibia 1,376 km
Zambia 1,110 km
Republic of the Congo 201 km

- Coastline: 1,600 km

=== Environment of Angola ===
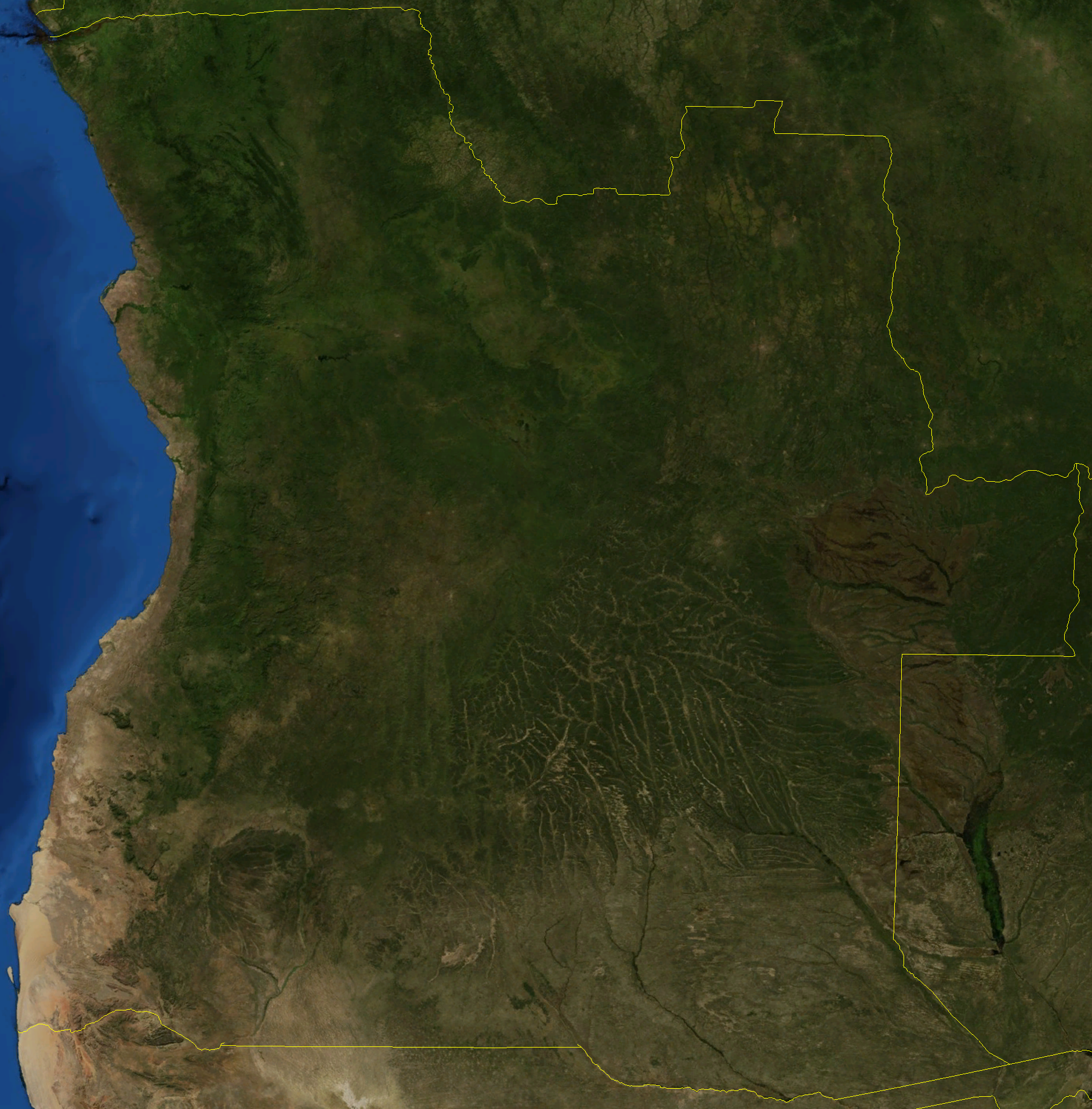
An enlargeable satellite image of Angola

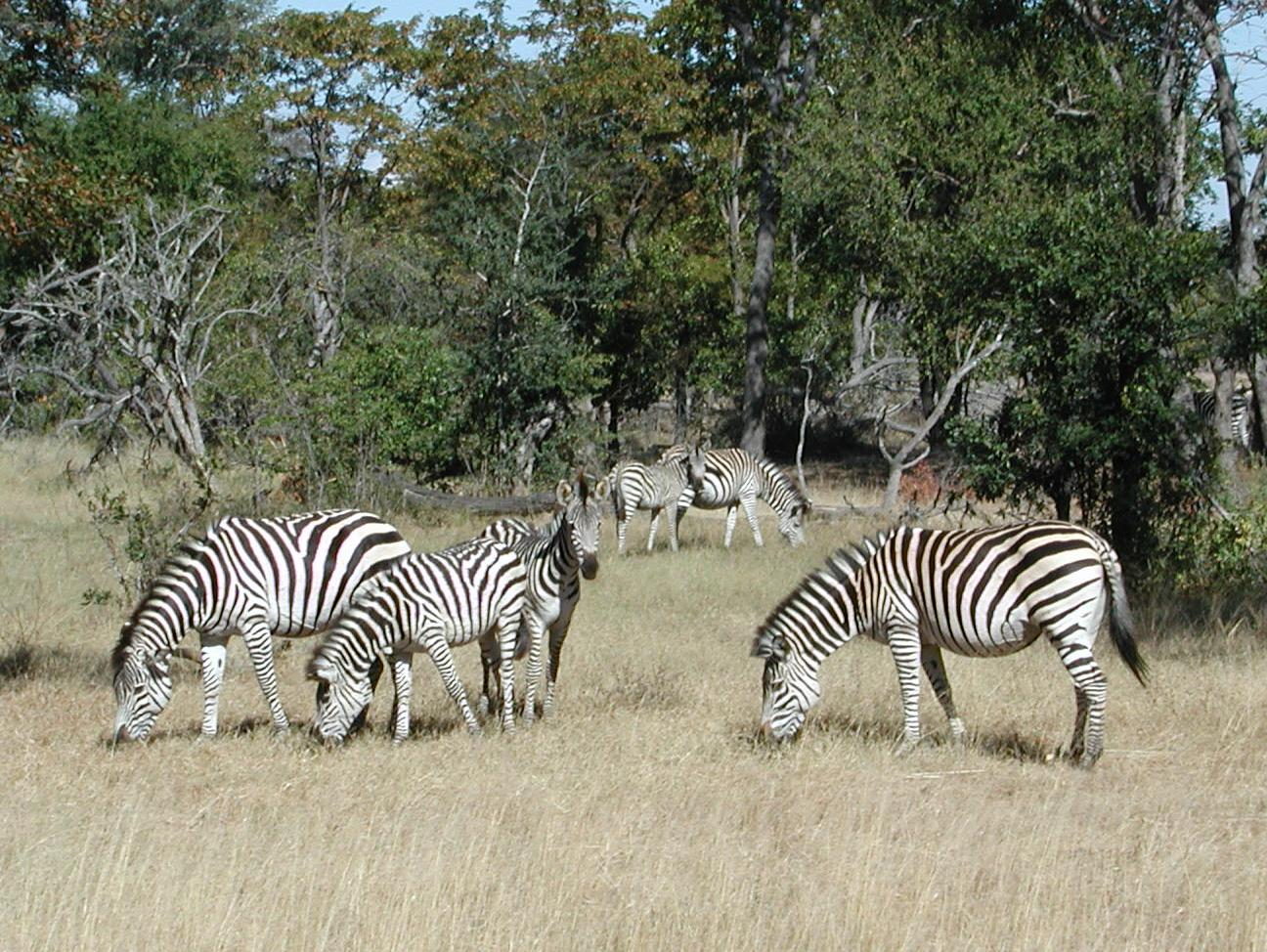
Plains zebra

- Climate of Angola
- Ecoregions in Angola
- Protected areas in Angola
- Wildlife of Angola
  - Fauna of Angola
    - Birds of Angola
    - Mammals of Angola

==== Natural geographic features of Angola ====
- Glaciers in Angola: None
- Islands of Angola
- Rivers of Angola
- World Heritage Sites in Angola: None

=== Regions of Angola ===
Regions of Angola

==== Ecoregions of Angola ====
List of ecoregions in Angola

==== Administrative divisions of Angola ====
Administrative divisions of Angola

- Provinces of Angola
  - Municipalities of Angola
  - Communes of Angola

Map of the provinces of Angola

===== Angola is divided into eighteen provinces: =====
- Bengo
- Benguela
- Bié
- Cabinda
- Cuando Cubango
- Cuanza Norte
- Cuanza Sul
- Cunene
- Huambo
- Huíla
- Luanda
- Lunda Norte
- Lunda Sul
- Malanje
- Moxico
- Namibe
- Uíge
- Zaire

Bengo Province

- Ambriz
- Dande
- Icolo e Bengo
- Nambuangongo
- Quicama

Benguela Province

- Baia Farta
- Balombo
- Benguela
- Bocoio
- Caimbambo
- Chongoroi
- Cubal
- Ganda
- Lobito

Bié Province

- Andulo
- Camacupa
- Catabola
- Chinguar
- Chitembo
- Cuemba
- Cunhinga
- Kuito
- N'harea

Cabinda Province

- Belize
- Buco-zau
- Cabinda
- Landana

Cuando Cubango Province

- Calai
- Cuangar
- Cuchi
- Cuito Cuanavale
- Dirico
- Mavinga
- Menongue
- Nankova
- Rivungo

Cuanza Norte Province

- Ambaca
- Banga
- Bolongongo
- Bula Atumba
- Cambambe
- Cazengo
- Dembos
- Golungo Alto
- Gonguembo
- Lucala
- Pango Aluquem
- Quiculungo
- Samba Caju

Cuanza Sul Province

- Amboim
- Cassongue
- Conda
- Ebo
- Libolo
- Mussende
- Porto Amboim
- Quibala
- Quilenda
- Seles
- Sumbe
- Waku-Kungo

Cunene Province

- Cahama
- Cuanhama
- Curoca
- Cuvelai
- Namacunde
- Ombadja

Huambo Province

- Bailundo
- Caála
- Ekunha
- Huambo
- Katchiungo
- Londuimbali
- Longojo
- Mungo
- Tchikala-tcholo
- Tchindjenje
- Ukuma

Huíla Province

- Caconda
- Caluquembe
- Chiange
- Chibia
- Chicomba
- Chipindo
- Humpata
- Kuvango
- Lubango
- Matala
- Quilengues
- Quipungo

Luanda Province

- Cacuaco
- Luanda
- Viana

Lunda Norte Province

- Cambulo
- Capenda Camulemb
- Caungula
- Chitato
- Cuango
- Cuilo
- Lubalo
- Lucapa
- Xa-muteba

Lunda Sul Province

- Cacolo
- Dala
- Muconda
- Saurimo

Malanje Province

- Cacuso
- Calandula
- Cambundi-catembo
- Cangandala
- Caombo
- Kiwaba N'zogi
- Kunda Dia-baze
- Luquembo
- Malanje
- Marimba
- Massango
- Mucari
- Quela
- Quirima

Moxico Province

- Alto Zambeze
- Camanongue
- Leua
- Luacano
- Luau
- Kangamba
- Lumbala N'guimbo
- Lumege
- Moxico

Namibe Province

- Bibala
- Camacuio
- Namibe
- Tombua
- Virei

Uíge Province

- Alto Cauale
- Ambuila
- Bembe
- Buengas
- Bungo
- Damba
- Maquela Do Zombo
- Mucaba
- Negale
- Puri
- Quimbele
- Quitexe
- Santa Cruz
- Sanza Pombo
- Songo
- Uige

Zaire Province

- Cuimba
- M'banza Congo
- N'zeto
- Noqui
- Soyo
- Tomboco

- Cities of Angola
  - Capital of Angola: Luanda

=== Demography of Angola ===
Demographics of Angola

== Government and politics of Angola ==
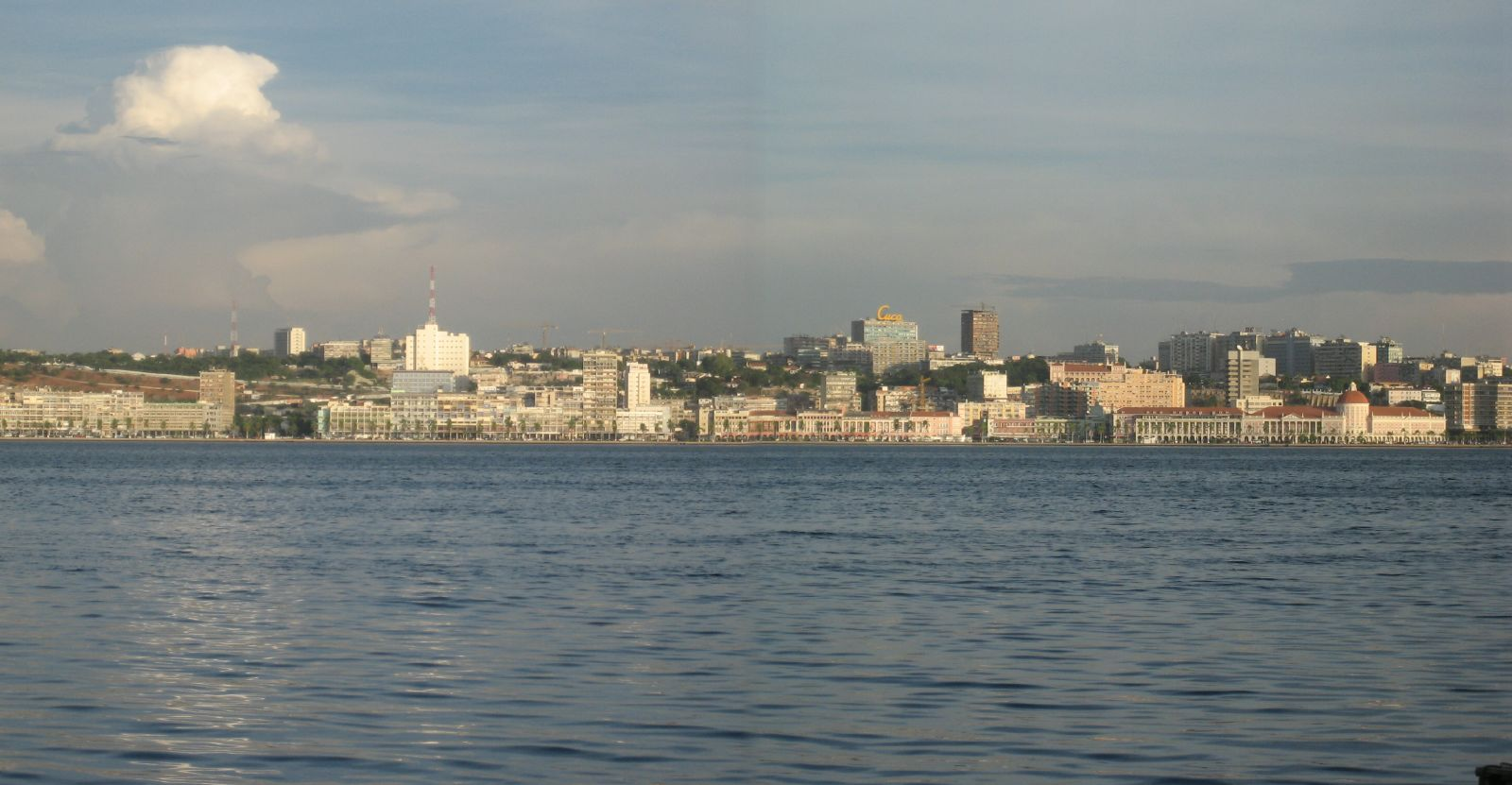
Luanda, the capital of Angola

Politics of Angola

- Form of government: presidential republic
- Capital of Angola: Luanda
- Elections in Angola
  - Angolan presidential elections
    - 1992
    - 2009
  - Angolan parliamentary elections
    - 1980
    - 1986
    - 1992
    - 2008
    - 2012
    - 2017
- Political parties in Angola

=== Branches of the government of Angola ===
Government of Angola

==== Executive branch of the government of Angola ====
- Head of state and Head of government: President of Angola, João Lourenço
  - Vice President of Angola, Esperança da Costa
- Cabinet of Angola

==== Legislative branch of the government of Angola ====
- National Assembly of Angola (unicameral)

==== Judicial branch of the government of Angola ====
Court system of Angola

=== Foreign relations of Angola ===
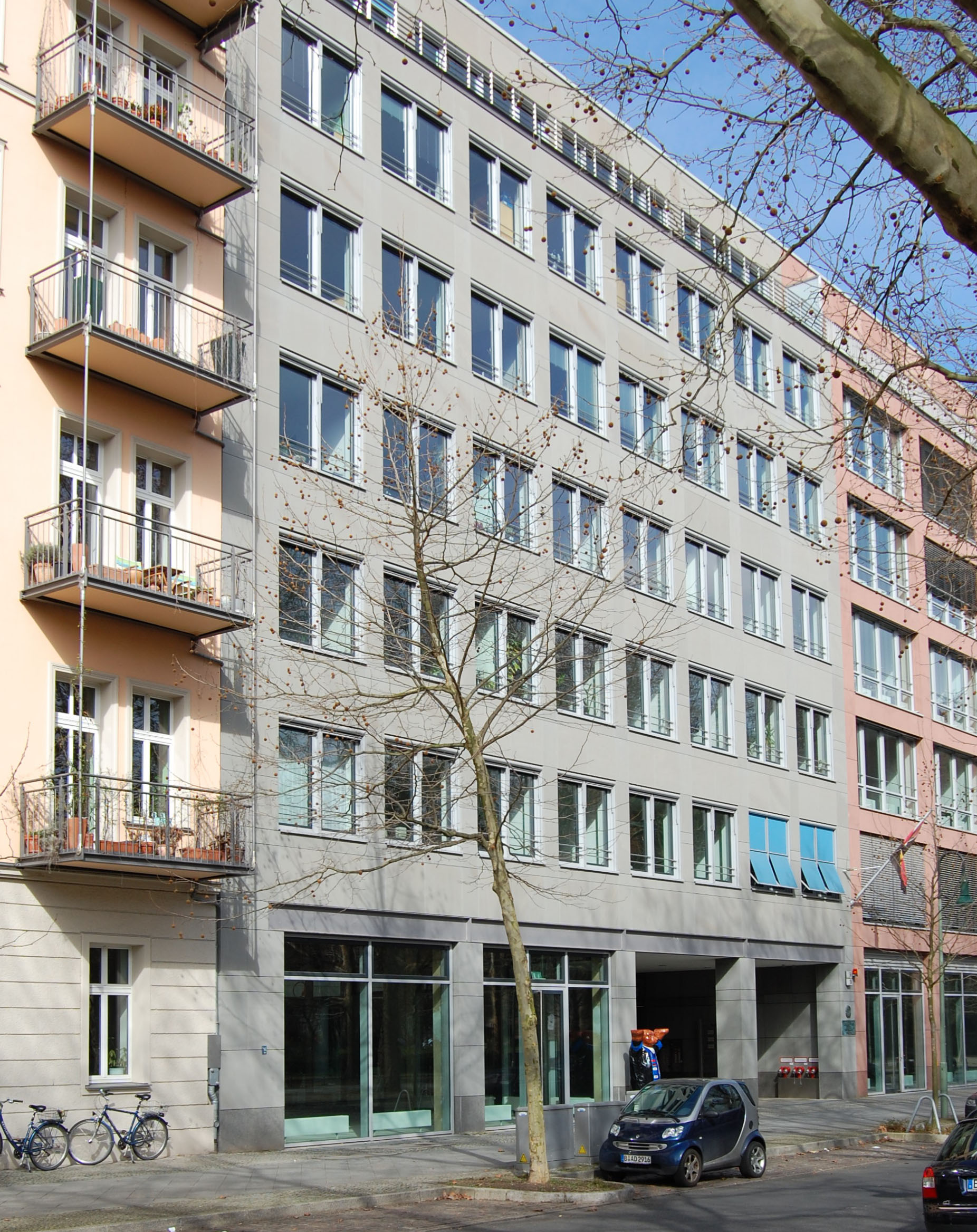
Embassy of Angola in Berlin

Foreign relations of Angola

- Diplomatic missions in Angola
- Diplomatic missions of Angola

==== International organization membership ====
The Republic of Angola is a member of:

- African Development Bank Group (AfDB)
- African Union (AU)
- African, Caribbean, and Pacific Group of States (ACP)
- Community of Portuguese Language Countries (CPLP)
- Food and Agriculture Organization (FAO)
- Group of 77 (G77)
- International Atomic Energy Agency (IAEA)
- International Bank for Reconstruction and Development (IBRD)
- International Civil Aviation Organization (ICAO)
- International Criminal Court (ICCt) (signatory)
- International Criminal Police Organization (Interpol)
- International Development Association (IDA)
- International Federation of Red Cross and Red Crescent Societies (IFRCS)
- International Finance Corporation (IFC)
- International Fund for Agricultural Development (IFAD)
- International Labour Organization (ILO)
- International Maritime Organization (IMO)
- International Monetary Fund (IMF)
- International Olympic Committee (IOC)
- International Organization for Migration (IOM)
- International Organization for Standardization (ISO) (correspondent)
- International Red Cross and Red Crescent Movement (ICRM)
- International Telecommunication Union (ITU)
- International Telecommunications Satellite Organization (ITSO)
- International Trade Union Confederation (ITUC)
- Inter-Parliamentary Union (IPU)
- Multilateral Investment Guarantee Agency (MIGA)
- Nonaligned Movement (NAM)
- Organization of American States (OAS) (observer)
- Organization of Petroleum Exporting Countries (OPEC)
- Southern African Development Community (SADC)
- União Latina
- United Nations (UN)
- United Nations Conference on Trade and Development (UNCTAD)
- United Nations Educational, Scientific, and Cultural Organization (UNESCO)
- United Nations Industrial Development Organization (UNIDO)
- Universal Postal Union (UPU)
- World Customs Organization (WCO)
- World Federation of Trade Unions (WFTU)
- World Health Organization (WHO)
- World Intellectual Property Organization (WIPO)
- World Meteorological Organization (WMO)
- World Tourism Organization (UNWTO)
- World Trade Organization (WTO)

Angola is one of only seven U.N. members which is not a member of the Organisation for the Prohibition of Chemical Weapons.

=== Law and order in Angola ===
Law of Angola

- Constitution of Angola
- Human rights in Angola
  - LGBT rights in Angola
  - Woman in Angola
  - Disability in Angola
  - Freedom of religion in Angola
- Law Enforcement in Angola

=== Military of Angola ===
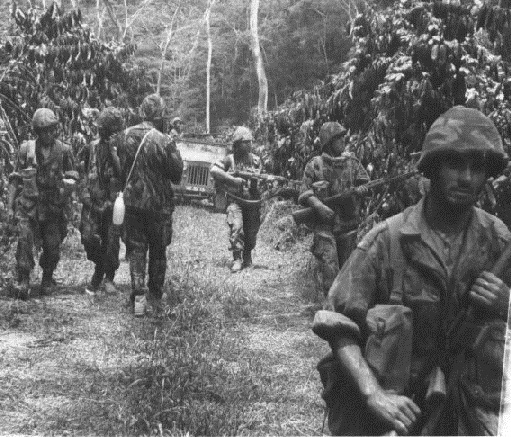
Portuguese troops on patrol in Angola

Military of Angola

- Command
  - Commander-in-chief: President of Angola
- Forces
  - Army of Angola
  - Navy of Angola
  - Air Force of Angola
- Military history of Angola

== History of Angola ==
History of Angola

=== History of Angola, by period ===
- Precolonial history
- Colonial history
- War of independence
- Civil War period
- Post-war period

=== History of Angola, by subject ===
- History of rail transport in Angola
- History of the Jews in Angola
- Military history of Angola

== Culture of Angola ==
- Architecture of Angola
- Cuisine of Angola
- Languages of Angola
- Media in Angola
- National symbols of Angola
  - Coat of arms of Angola
  - Flag of Angola
  - National anthem of Angola
- Demographics of Angola
- Prostitution in Angola
- Public holidays in Angola
- Religion in Angola
  - Christianity in Angola
  - Hinduism in Angola
  - Islam in Angola
  - Judaism in Angola
- World Heritage Sites in Angola: none

=== Art in Angola ===
- Angolan art
- Cinema of Angola
- Literature of Angola
- Music of Angola
- Television in Angola

=== Sports in Angola ===
Sports in Angola

- Angola at the Olympics
- Basketball in Angola
- Football in Angola
  - Angola national football team

== Economy and infrastructure of Angola ==
- Economic rank, by nominal GDP (2007): 61st (sixty first)
- Agriculture in Angola
- Banking in Angola
  - National Bank of Angola
- Communications in Angola
  - Internet in Angola
- Companies of Angola
- Currency of Angola: Kwanza
  - ISO 4217: AQA
- Energy in Angola
  - Energy in Angola
- Health in Angola
  - Health care in Angola
- Mining in Angola
- Angola Stock Exchange and Derivatives
- Tourism in Angola
  - Visa policy of Angola
- Transport in Angola
  - Airports in Angola
  - Rail transport in Angola

== Education in Angola ==
- History of education in Angola
- List of schools in Angola
- List of universities in Angola

== See also ==
Angola

- List of Angola-related topics
- List of international rankings
- Member state of the United Nations
- Outline of Africa
- Outline of geography
