= Christianity in Angola =

Christianity in Angola has existed since 1491. Today 80% of Angolans practise some form of Christianity.

== History ==
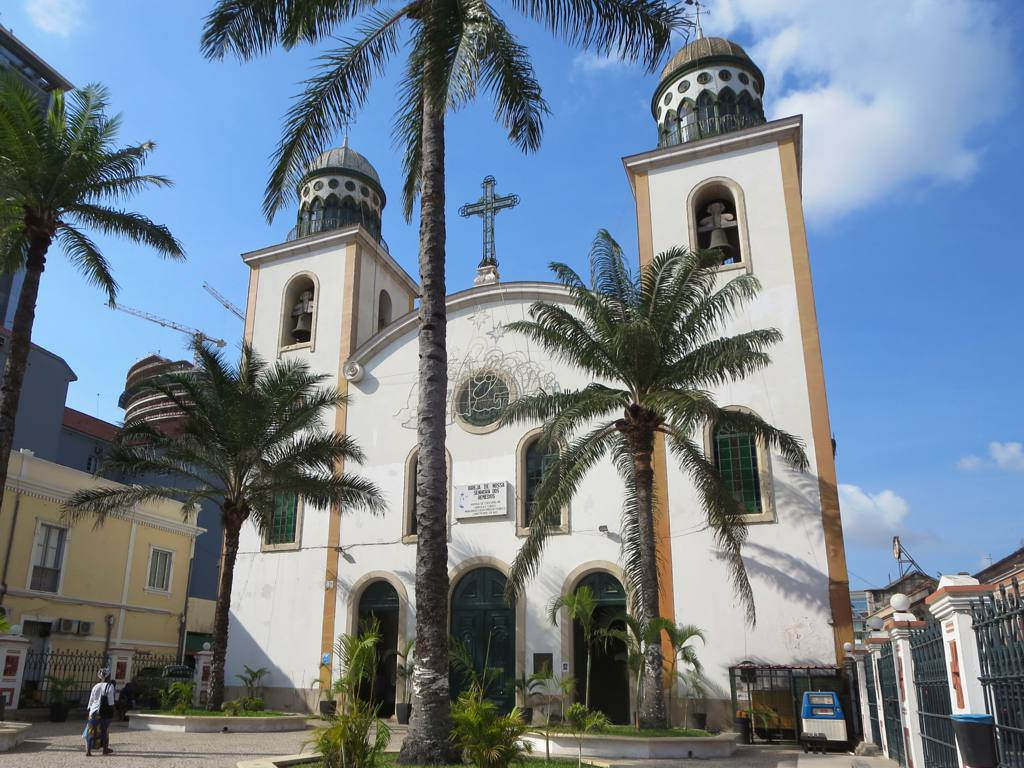
The Cathedral of Luanda

Christianity in Angola began in 1491, with a Catholic mission in the São Salvador area. João I, Manikongo of the powerful Kongo Kingdom, converted to Christianity, and his son, Afonso I, also a Christian, became a well-known figure, reigning from 1509 to 1543.

In 1878, the first Protestant missionaries, British Baptists, arrived in Angola. In 1897, the Angola Evangelical Mission was established in Cabinda, and the North Angola Mission started in 1925, in Uige.

Although Catholic missions were largely staffed by non-Portuguese during the colonial era, the relevant statutes and accords provided that foreign missionaries could be admitted only with the approval of the Portuguese government and the Vatican and on condition that they be integrated with the Portuguese missionary organization. Foreign Catholic missionaries were required to renounce the laws of their own country, submit to Portuguese law, and furnish proof of their ability to speak and write the Portuguese language correctly.

Missionary activity was placed under the authority of Portuguese priests. All of this was consistent with the Colonial Act of 1930, which advanced the view that Portuguese Catholic missions overseas were "instruments of civilization and national influence". In 1940, the education of Africans was declared the exclusive responsibility of missionary personnel. All church activities, education included, were to be subsidized by the state. In reality, Protestant missions were permitted to engage in educational activity, but without subsidy and on condition that Portuguese be the language of instruction.

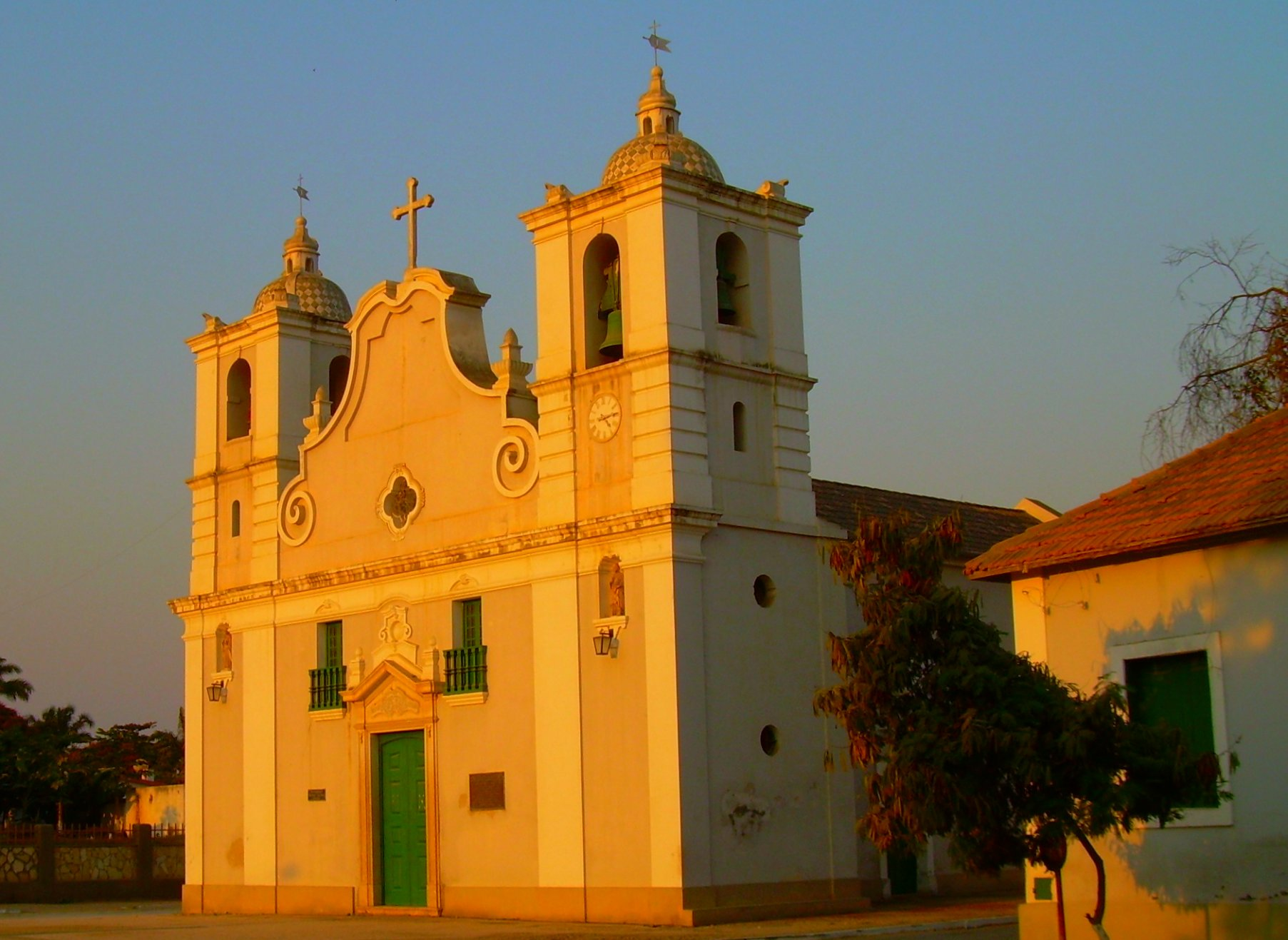
Old Portuguese church in Benguela

The important Protestant missions in place in the 1960s (or their predecessors) had arrived in Angola in the late 19th century and therefore had been at work before the Portuguese managed to establish control over the entire territory. Their early years, therefore, were little affected by Portuguese policy and practice. Before the establishment of the New State (Estado Novo) in Portugal in 1926, the authorities kept an eye on the Protestant missions but were not particularly hostile to them. Settlers and local administrators often were hostile, however, because Protestant missionaries tended to be protective of what they considered their charges. In those early years and later, Protestant missionaries were not only evangelists but also teachers, healers, and counselors - all perhaps in a paternal fashion but in ways that involved contact with Africans in a more sustained fashion than was characteristic of Roman Catholic missionaries and local administrators.

Protestant missionaries worked at learning the local languages, in part to communicate better with those in their mission field, but above all in order to translate the Old Testament and the New Testament into African tongues. Protestant missionaries were much more likely than administrators and settlers to know a local language. Roman Catholic missionaries did not similarly emphasize the translation of the Bible and, with some exceptions, did not make a point of learning a Bantu language.

Because specific Protestant denominations were associated with particular ethnic communities, the structure of religious organization was linked to the structure of these communities. This connection was brought about in part by the tendency of entire communities to turn to the variety of Protestantism offered locally. The conversion of isolated individuals was rare. Those individuals who did not become Christians remained to a greater or lesser extent adherents of the indigenous system; unless they migrated to one of the larger towns, persons of a specific locality did not have the option of another kind of Christianity.

Those members of a community who had not yet become Christians were tied by kinship and propinquity to those individuals who had. On the one hand, indigenous patterns of social relations affected church organization; on the other hand, the presence of Christians in the community affected the local culture to varying degrees. Christians who could quote Scripture in the local tongue contributed phrases to it that others picked up, and the attributes of the Christian God as interpreted by the specific denomination sometimes became attached to the high god of the indigenous religious system and typically made that deity more prominent than previously.

The involvement of the Protestant churches in the languages of their mission areas, their medical and other welfare activity, and their ability to adapt to local structures or (in the case of the Methodists among the Mbundu) to be fortuitously consistent with them gave Protestants much more influence than their numbers would suggest. For example, the leaders of the three major nationalist movements in the 1970s - the MPLA, UNITA, and the FNLA - had been raised as Protestants, and many others in these movements were also Protestants, even if their commitment may have diminished over time.

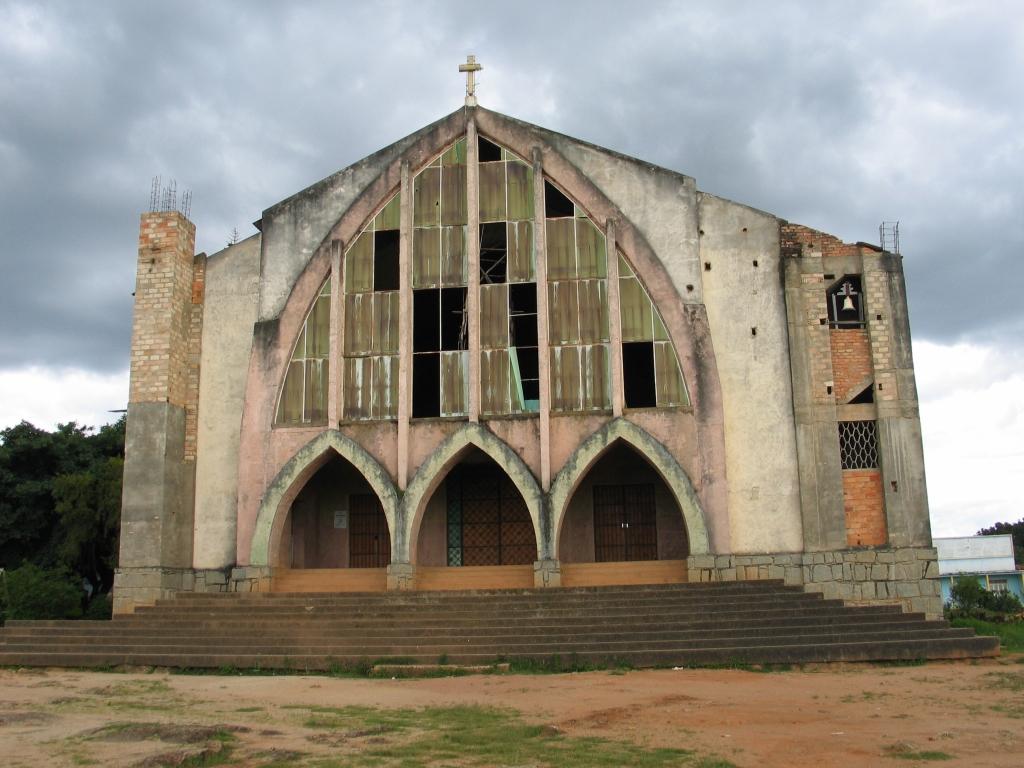
Catholic Church in Huambo

Estimates of the number of Roman Catholics in Angola varied. One source claimed that about 55 percent of the population in 1985 was Roman Catholic; another put the proportion in 1987 at 68 percent. Most Roman Catholics lived in western Angola, not only because that part of the country was the most densely populated but also because Portuguese penetration into the far interior was comparatively recent and Roman Catholic missionaries tended to follow the flag.

The most heavily Roman Catholic area before independence was Cabinda Province, where most of the people were Bakongo. Bakongo in Angola proper were not quite so heavily Roman Catholic, and Protestantism was very influential there. There was a substantial proportion of Roman Catholics among the Mbundu in Luanda and Cuanza Norte provinces. Less heavily Catholic were the Ovimbundu-populated provinces of Benguela and Huambo, although the city of Huambo had been estimated to be two-thirds Catholic. In the southern and eastern districts, the proportion of Roman Catholics dropped considerably.

== Demographics ==
According to the 2014 census, Catholicism was practiced by 41.1% of the population. A total of 38.1% were Protestants, while 20.9% practiced indigenous beliefs, other religions, or no religion.

== Christian identification ==
In contemporary Angola, the Bakongo are one of the most heavily Christian groups, with only 1.5% holding indigenous beliefs. Groups that are not Christian include the Mumuila, Mbwela (Nganguela), Mungambwe, Kwangali, Himba and Nyaneka.

Religious affiliation in Angola was difficult to define because many who claimed membership in a specific Christian denomination also shared perceptions of the natural and supernatural order characteristic of indigenous religious systems. Sometimes the Christian sphere of the life of a community was institutionally separate from the indigenous sphere. In other cases, the local meaning and practice of Christianity were modified by indigenous patterns of belief and practice.

The proportion of Protestants in the Angolan population was estimated at 10 percent to 20 percent in the late 1980s. The majority of them presumably were Africans, although some mestiços may have been affiliated with one or another Protestant church.

The government recognized eleven Protestant denominations: the Assembly of God, the Baptist Convention of Angola, the Baptist Evangelical Church in Angola, the Evangelical Congregational Church in Angola, the Evangelical Church of Angola, the Evangelical Church of South-West Angola, the Our Lord Jesus Christ Church in the World (Kimbanguist), the Evangelical Reformed Church in Angola, the Seventh-day Adventist Church, the Union of Evangelical Churches of Angola, and the United Methodist Church.

In the late 1980s, statistics on Christian preferences among ethnic groups were unavailable, but proportions calculated from the 1960 census probably had not changed significantly. According to the 1960 census, about 21 percent of the Ovimbundu were Protestants, but later estimates suggest a smaller percentage. The sole Protestant group active among the Mbundu was the Methodist Mission, largely sponsored by the Methodist Episcopal Church of the United States. Portuguese data for 1960 indicated that only 8 percent of the Mbundu considered themselves Protestants, but Protestant missions had considerable success among the Dembos. As many as 35 percent of the Bakongo were considered Protestants by the official religious census of 1960, with Baptists being the most numerous.

In addition to the Protestant churches directly generated by the missions and continuing in a more or less orthodox pattern, there were other groups, which stemmed at least in part from the Protestant experience but expressed a peculiarly local tendency and which were dominated entirely by Africans. The number of Angolans identifying with such African churches is not known, but it is reasonable to assume that many Angolans were attached to them.

== Latter-day Saints ==
The Church of Jesus Christ of Latter-day Saints has more than 1,000 members in 5 congregations in Angola.

== See also ==
- Religion in Angola
- Roman Catholicism in Angola
- Protestantism in Angola
