= Bungo, Angola =

Municipality in Angola

Coordinates: 7°26′24″S 15°23′12″E

Bungo is a town and municipality in Uíge Province, Angola.

The municipality, established on August 16, 1916, has about 2156 square kilometers and 37,153 residents in 2014. It is bounded by the municipalities of Damba (north), Sanza Pombo (east), Puri and Negage (south), and Uíge and Mucaba (west). The capital, of the same name, is its only town.
