= Religion in Angola =

Religious beliefs in Angola

Religion in Angola (2024)
1. Catholicism (44.2%)
2. Protestantism (34.9%)
3. None (11.5%)
4. Islam (0.40%)
5. Animism (0.10%)
6. Judaism (0.10%)
7. Other (6.40%)
8. Do not know/no response (2.40%)

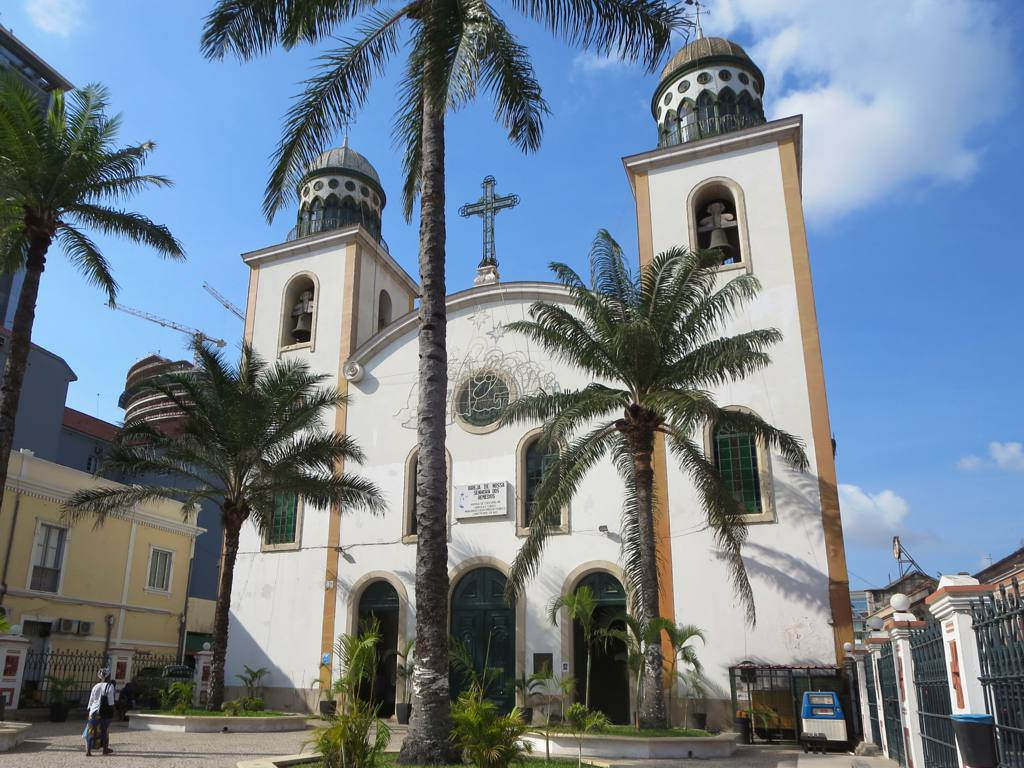
Cathedral of Our Lady of Remedies in the capital Luanda

Christianity is the predominant religion in Angola, with Catholicism being its largest denomination.

Angola is a secular state and its constitution guarantees freedom of religion.

== Religion and government ==
The attitude of the Angolan regime toward religion has been inconsistent. The MPLA's commitment to Marxism-Leninism, 1977–1991, meant that its attitude toward religion, at least officially, corresponded during that period to that of the traditional Soviet Marxist–Leninist dogma, which generally characterized religion as antiquated and irrelevant to the construction of a new society. The government also viewed religion as an instrument of colonialism because of the Catholic Church's close association with the Portuguese. Furthermore, because membership in the party was the road to influence, party leaders and many of the cadres were likely to have no formal religious commitment, or at any rate to deny having one (even though most of Angola's leaders in the 1980s were educated at Catholic, Baptist, Methodist or Congregational mission schools). Nonetheless, the government acknowledged the prevalence of religion in Angolan societies and officially recognized the equality of all religions, tolerating religious practices as long as the churches restricted themselves to spiritual matters. The state, however, did institute certain specific controls over religious organizations, and was prepared to act quickly when it felt that it was challenged by the acts of a specific group. Thus, in early 1978 the MPLA Political Bureau ordered the registration of "legitimate" churches and religious organizations at the "National Institute for Religious Matters", created in the framework of the Ministry of Culture. Although foreign priests and missionaries were permitted to stay in the country, and although religious groups or churches could receive goods from abroad, further construction of new churches without a permit was forbidden.

A conflict developed in the late 1970s between the government and the Catholic Church. In December 1977, the bishops of Angola's three archdioceses, meeting in Lubango, drafted a pastoral letter subsequently read to all churches that claimed frequent violations of religious freedom. Their most specific complaint was that the establishment of a single system of education ignored the rights of parents. They also objected to the government's systematic atheistic propaganda and its silencing of the church's radio station in 1976. In response to charges of government meddling in religious affairs, President Neto issued a decree in January 1978 stating that there was complete separation between church and religious institutions. In addition, Jornal de Angola printed an attack on the bishops, accusing them of questioning the integrity of the Angolan revolutionary process.

The outcome of the conflict had repercussions for Protestant churches as well as for the Catholic Church. In essence, the government made it clear that religious institutions were to adhere to government and party rulings regarding non-religious issues.

In the late 1980s, there was a slight change in the government's policy toward religion. The president and others in the government and party elites, recognizing that political opposition had not coalesced around religious leaders, became less fearful of religious opposition and therefore more tolerant of religious groups in general. One exception was the “Igreja de Nosso Senhor Jesus Cristo no Mundo” (Church of Our Lord Jesus Christ in the World), an independent Christian sect founded in 1949 by Simão Toko (also spelled Simão Toco). Toko, a Protestant from Uíge Province, fashioned the sect after the Kimbanguist movement (not to be confused with traditional kimbanda practices, which had arisen in the Belgian Congo in the 1920s). The government had been especially suspicious of the Tokoists because of their strong support in Benguela Province, most of whose residents were Ovimbundu, the principal supporters of UNITA. Tokoists also were involved in riots in the Catete region of Bengo Province and in Luanda at the end of 1986, and they attacked a prison in Luanda in 1987 in an attempt to free fellow believers who had been arrested in the 1986 riots. As a result, the government banned the sect, claiming that its members had used religion to attack the state and had therefore lost their legitimacy. Subsequently, however, as part of the general relaxation of its policy on religion, the government softened its position on the sect and in March 1988 declared it a legal religion. The issue had in the meantime become less relevant, because religious communities - mostly Pentecostal (such as the Universal Church of the Kingdom of God) - had mushroomed throughout the country, mostly in Luanda and other important towns, often under Brazilian influence.

The situation changed substantially when the MPLA abandoned Marxism-Leninism in 1991 and adopted a constitution that provided for multiparty democracy (albeit in a highly presidentialist version). Restrictions on the liberty of religion were all but abolished, as was the obligation to abide by the directives issued by the MPLA. However, the government - still dominated by the MPLA, especially after the parliamentary elections of 2008 - maintains a certain monitoring of the religious communities, through the Instituto Nacional das Religiões. This institute, at present headed by a former Catholic priest, holds a register of all religious communities - well over 1000 in 2011 - pronounces selectively an official recognitions which imply a certain measure of recognition and support, and maintains a permanent dialogue with the more important communities.

== Religions ==
Religious population in Angola (2024 census)
Religion	Population	%
Catholic	15.261.347	44.2
Protestant	12.024.481	34.9
Unaffiliated	3.962.723	11.5
Islam	138.562	0.4
Animism	44.851	0.1
Judaism	35.277	0.1
Refused to answer	825.644	2.4
Other religious affiliation	2.200.003	6.4
Total population	34.492.888	100.0

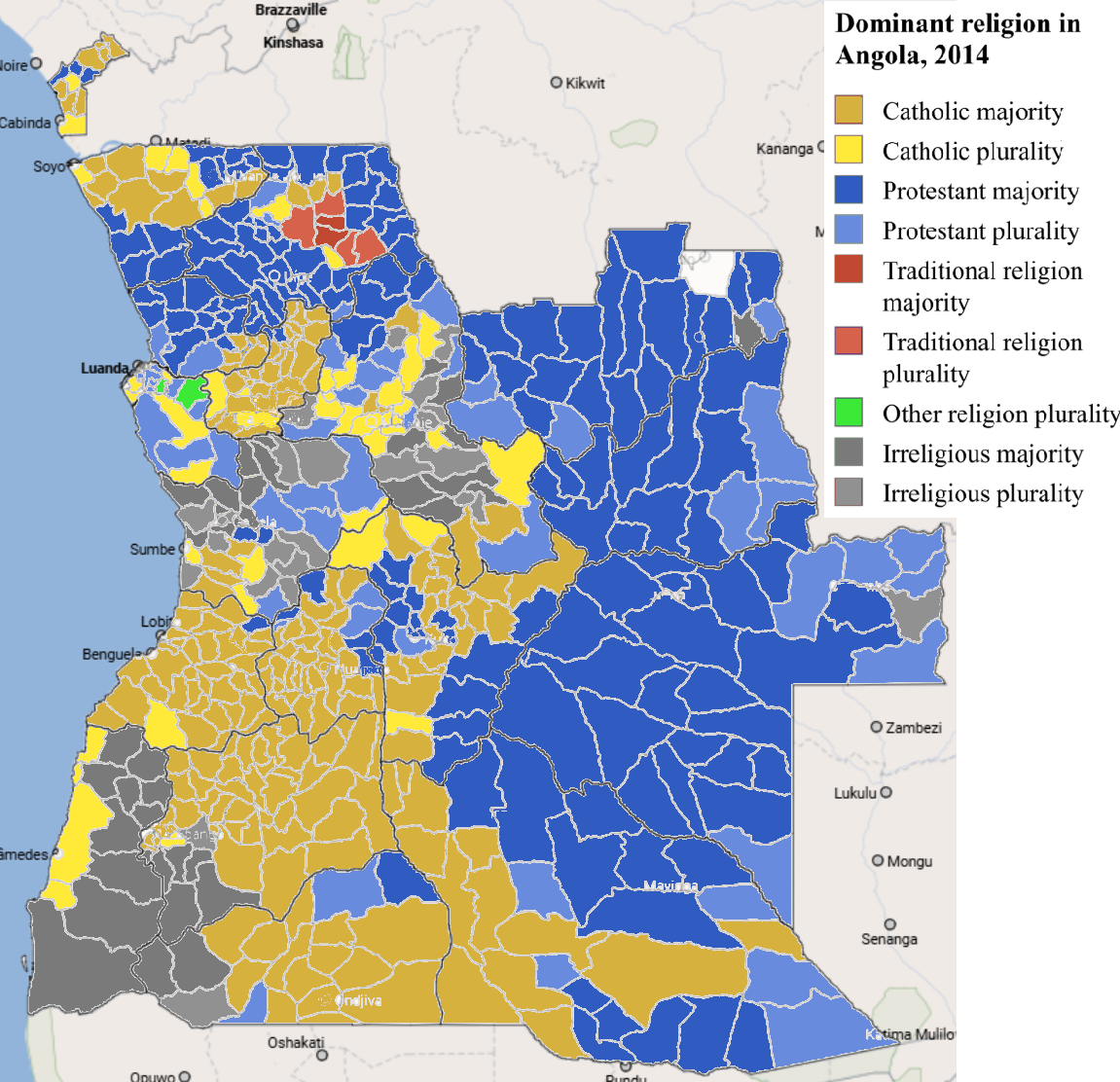
Dominant religion in Angola by district according to the 2014 census

=== Christianity ===
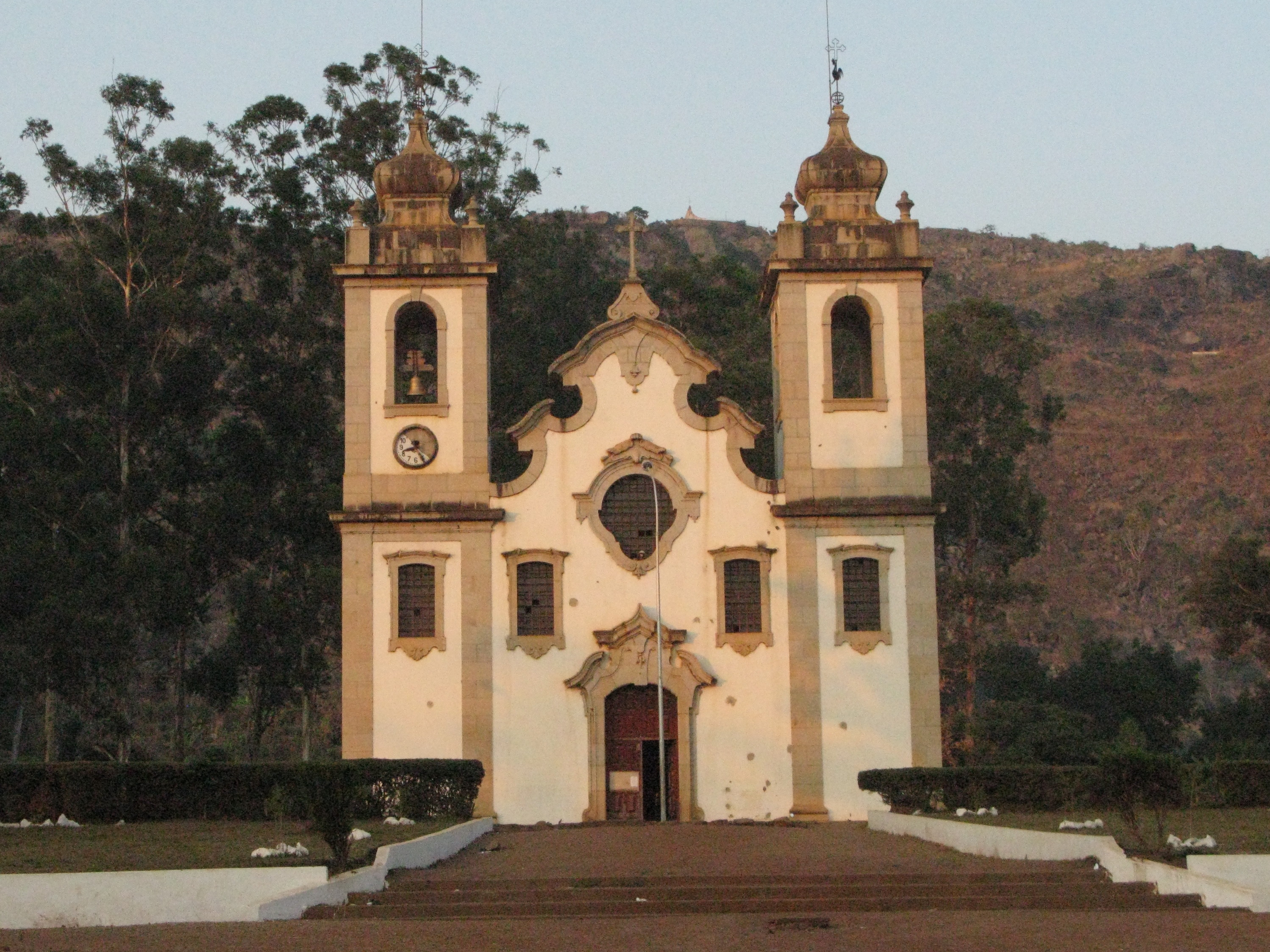
A church in Uaco Cungo

Religious affiliation in Angola was difficult to define because many who claimed membership in a specific Christian denomination also shared perceptions of the natural and supernatural order characteristic of indigenous religious systems. Sometimes the Christian sphere of the life of a community was institutionally separate from the indigenous sphere. In other cases, the local meaning and practice of Christianity were modified by indigenous patterns of belief and practice.

Although Catholic missions were largely staffed by non-Portuguese during the colonial era, the relevant statutes and accords provided that foreign missionaries could be admitted only with the approval of the Portuguese government and the Vatican and on condition that they be integrated with the Portuguese missionary organization. Foreign Catholic missionaries were required to renounce the laws of their own country, submit to Portuguese law, and furnish proof of their ability to speak and write the Portuguese language correctly. Missionary activity was placed under the authority of Portuguese priests. All of this was consistent with the Colonial Act of 1930, which advanced the view that Portuguese Catholic missions overseas were "instruments of civilization and national influence". In 1940 the education of Africans was declared the exclusive responsibility of missionary personnel. All church activities, education included, were to be subsidized by the state. In reality, Protestant missions were permitted to engage in educational activity, but without subsidy and on condition that Portuguese be the language of instruction.

The important Protestant missions in place in the 1960s (or their predecessors) had arrived in Angola in the late nineteenth century and therefore had been at work before the Portuguese managed to establish control over the entire territory. Their early years, therefore, were little affected by Portuguese policy and practice. Before the establishment of the New State (Estado Novo) in Portugal in 1926, the authorities kept an eye on the Protestant missions but were not particularly hostile to them. Settlers and local administrators often were hostile, however, because Protestant missionaries tended to be protective of what they considered their charges. In those early years and later, Protestant missionaries were not only evangelists but also teachers, healers, and counselors - all perhaps in a paternal fashion but in ways that involved contact with Africans in a more sustained fashion than was characteristic of Catholic missionaries and local administrators.

Protestant missionaries worked at learning the local languages, in part to communicate better with those in their mission field, but above all in order to translate the Old Testament and the New Testament into African tongues. Protestant missionaries were much more likely than administrators and settlers to know a local language. Catholic missionaries did not similarly emphasize the translation of the Bible and, with some exceptions, did not make a point of learning a Bantu language.

Because specific Protestant denominations were associated with particular ethnic communities, the structure of religious organization was linked to the structure of these communities. This connection was brought about in part by the tendency of entire communities to turn to the variety of Protestantism offered locally. The conversion of isolated individuals was rare. Those individuals who did not become Christians remained to a greater or lesser extent adherents of the indigenous system; unless they migrated to one of the larger towns, persons of a specific locality did not have the option of another kind of Christianity. Those members of a community who had not yet become Christians were tied by kinship and propinquity to those individuals who had. On the one hand, indigenous patterns of social relations affected church organization; on the other hand, the presence of Christians in the community affected the local culture to varying degrees. Christians who could quote Scripture in the local tongue contributed phrases to it that others picked up, and the attributes of the Christian God as interpreted by the specific denomination sometimes became attached to the high god of the indigenous religious system and typically made that deity more prominent than previously.

The involvement of the Protestant churches in the languages of their mission areas, their medical and other welfare activity, and their ability to adapt to local structures or (in the case of the Methodists among the Mbundu) to be fortuitously consistent with them gave Protestants much more influence than their numbers would suggest. For example, the leaders of the three major nationalist movements in the 1970s - the MPLA, UNITA, and the FNLA - had been raised as Protestants, and many others in these movements were also Protestants, even if their commitment may have diminished over time.

Estimates of the number of Catholics in Angola varied. One source claimed that about 55 percent of the population in 1985 was Catholic; another put the proportion in 1987 at 68 percent. Most Catholics lived in western Angola, not only because that part of the country was the most densely populated but also because Portuguese penetration into the far interior was comparatively recent and Catholic missionaries tended to follow the flag. The most heavily Catholic area before independence was Cabinda Province, where most of the people were Bakongo. Bakongo in Angola proper were not quite so heavily Catholic, and Protestantism was very influential there. There was a substantial proportion of Catholics among the Mbundu in Luanda and Cuanza Norte provinces. Less heavily Catholic were the Ovimbundu-populated provinces of Benguela and Huambo, although the city of Huambo had been estimated to be two-thirds Catholic. In the southern and eastern districts, the proportion of Catholics dropped considerably.

The proportion of Protestants in the Angolan population was estimated at 10 percent to 20 percent in the late 1980s. The majority of them presumably were Africans, although some mestiços may have been affiliated with one or another Protestant church.

The government recognized eleven Protestant denominations: the Assembly of God, the Baptist Convention of Angola, the Baptist Evangelical Church of Angola, the Evangelical Congregational Church of Angola, the Evangelical Church of Angola, the Evangelical Church of South-West Angola, the Our Lord Jesus Christ Church in the World (Kimbanguist), the Reformed Evangelical Church in Angola, the Seventh-day Adventist Church of Angola, the Union of Evangelical Churches of Angola, and the United Methodist Church of Angola.

In the late 1980s, statistics on Christian preferences among ethnic groups were unavailable, but proportions calculated from the 1960 census probably had not changed significantly. According to the 1960 census, about 21 percent of the Ovimbundu were Protestants, but later estimates suggest a smaller percentage. The sole Protestant group active among the Mbundu was the Methodist Mission, largely sponsored by the Methodist Episcopal Church of the United States. Portuguese data for 1960 indicated that only 8 percent of the Mbundu considered themselves Protestants, but Protestant missions had considerable success among the Dembos. As many as 35 percent of the Bakongo were considered Protestants by the official religious census of 1960, with Baptists being the most numerous.

In addition to the Protestant churches directly generated by the missions and continuing in a more or less orthodox pattern, there were other groups, which stemmed at least in part from the Protestant experience but expressed a peculiarly local tendency and which were dominated entirely by Africans. The number of Angolans identifying with such African churches is not known, but it is reasonable to assume that many Angolans were attached to them.

The Presbyterian Church of Angola was started in the 1980s and developed rapidly; it is present in 9 of the 18 Angolan Provinces.

The Church of Jesus Christ of Latter-day Saints has more than 1,000 members in 5 congregations in Angola.

=== Indigenous religious systems ===
There were as many indigenous religious systems in Angola as there were ethnic groups or even sections of ethnic groups. Two or more ethnic groups might share specific elements of belief, ritual, and organizational principle, but the configuration of these elements would be different for each group or section. Nevertheless, certain patterns were widespread.

Most traditional African religions claim the existence of a high god, but this deity's attributes vary. For example, some groups emphasize the high god's role as a creator, while others do not. Specific events in the human world are not usually explained by reference to this god, nor is a cult addressed to it.

The active entities in indigenous religious systems are ancestral and nature spirits. Ancestral spirits are considered relevant to the welfare of a descent group or its members, and nature spirits are considered relevant to the welfare of a community in a given location. However, specific individuals may be directly affected by one of the nature spirits resident in rocks or trees or in natural forces such as wind or lightning.

Ancestral spirits, especially those of recently deceased kin, must be honored with appropriate rituals if they are expected to look favorably on the enterprises of their descendants. Only some of these rituals are performed by the descent group as a whole. More frequently, they are performed by and on behalf of a segment of the group or an individual.

In theory, nature spirits are not generally considered to have led a human existence, but there are exceptions. Occasionally, the spirits of local rulers or others are detached from specific descent groups or are considered to have the characteristics of other nature spirits in that they are resident in features of the landscape.

The spirits of the ancestors of a kin group are looked to for assistance in economic and social matters, and some misfortunes - famine, poor crops, personal losses - are ascribed to failure to have performed the appropriate rituals or to having misbehaved in some other way. Not all misfortunes are attributed to ancestral or nature spirits, however. Many people believe that magical powers inhere in things and that these powers, though usually neutral, may be used malevolently to afflict others or to prevent others to deal with affliction, particularly illness and death. It is further thought that individuals, sometimes unconsciously and without the use of material or technical means, can bring illness or other affliction to human beings. Such persons, usually called witches, are thought to be marked by the presence of a substance in the stomach or other organ. The terms witch and sorcerer have been applied to those who use their power malevolently, and the distinction between the two is based in part on whether the power is inherited (witch) or acquired in exchange for something of value (sorcerer) - whether the power is mystical or technical and whether the power is used on one's (the witch's) own behalf or on behalf of others, at a price. In fact, this distinction is made only in some societies and may be linked to certain features of community social structures and associated with patterns of accusation - whether kin by blood or marriage or non-kin are held to be responsible.

Individual difficulties are attributed to witchcraft, sorcery, or the acts of ancestral or nature spirits. The determination is usually made by a diviner, a specialist whose personal power and use of material objects are held to be generally benevolent (although there are cases in which a diviner may be accused of sorcery) and whose sensitivity to patterns of stress and strain in the community help him or her arrive at a diagnosis. A diviner - widely called a kimbanda - may also have extensive knowledge of herbal medicine, and at least part of the work of the kimbanda is devoted to the application of that knowledge.

The kimbanda is said to have inherited or acquired the ability to communicate with spirits. In many cases, the acquisition of such power follows illness and possession by a specific spirit. The proficiency and degree of specialization of diviners varies widely. Some will deal only with particular symptoms; others enjoy broad repute and may include more than one village, or even more than one province, in their rounds. The greater the reputation of the kimbanda, the more he or she charges for services. This widespread term for diviner/healer has entered into local Portuguese, and so central is the role of the kimbanda to the complex of beliefs and practices characterizing most indigenous religions that some sources, such as the Jornal de Angola, have applied the term kimbandism to indigenous systems when cataloging Angolan religions.

In general, the belief in spirits (ancestral or natural), witches, and sorcerers is associated with a worldview that leaves no room for the accidental. Whether events are favorable or adverse, responsibility for them can in principle be attributed to a causal agent. If things go well, the correct ritual has been performed to placate the spirits or invoke their help. If things go badly, the correct ritual has not been performed, or a spirit has been otherwise provoked, or malevolent individuals have succeeded in breaching whatever protective (magical) measures have been taken against them. This outlook often persisted in Angola among individuals who had been influenced by Christianity or secular education. With some changes in particulars, it seemed to pervade urban areas, where a kimbanda rarely lacked clients.

=== Islam ===
Islam in Angola is a minority religion with 80,000-90,000 adherents, composed largely of migrants from West Africa and families of Lebanese origin. The Association of the Development of Islam in Angola is the primary proselytizing organization. Muslim Angolans are represented by the Supreme Council of Angolan Muslims of Luanda. The constitution of Angola prescribes freedom of belief, however, there have been press accounts the Muslim community is especially targeted by the Angolan government. Muslims are currently denied de facto the permit to pray in or build mosques.

=== Baháʼí Faith ===
The Baháʼí Faith in Angola begins after `Abdu'l-Bahá wrote letters encouraging taking the religion to Africa in 1916. The first Baháʼí pioneer arrived in Angola about 1952. By 1963 there was a Baháʼí Local Spiritual Assembly in Luanda and smaller groups of Baháʼís in other cities. In 1992 the Baháʼís of Angola elected their first National Spiritual Assembly.

=== Judaism ===
Jews have had a connection with Angola for hundreds of years.

In 2014 at the request of the local Jewish community, a Chabad center opened in Luanda, staffed by Rabbi Levi Itshak and Dvora Léa Chekly. Although Jews in the country were previously serviced by visiting Rabbinical students, the Chabad house represents the first known official Jewish house of worship to open in Angola.

=== Hinduism ===
Hinduism is practiced by some members of the Asian community, most of whom are foreigners. According to the Indian embassy in Angola, Angola's the number of people with Indian origin is fewer in Angola relative to other South African countries, and mainly comprises businessmen, professionals, and skilled workers.

== Freedom of religion ==
The Constitution provides for freedom of religion, and the government generally respected this right in practice. There were no reports of societal abuses or discrimination based on religious belief or practice.

In November 2013, it was reported that the Angolan government had banned Islam and mosques as contrary to the nation's culture.

In 2022, Freedom House rated Angola’s religious freedom as 2 out of 4.

== See also ==
- Catholicism in Angola
- Christianity in Angola
- Protestantism in Angola

== Bibliography ==
- José Redinha, Etnias e culturas de Angola, Luanda: Instituto de Investigação Científica de Angola, 1975
