= Santa Cruz, Angola =

Santa Cruz
- Municipality and county
- Location in Angola
- Coordinates: 6°59′S 16°8′E
- Country: Angola
- Province: Uíge Province

Population (2014 Census)
  - Total: 50,596
- Time zone: UTC+1 (WAT)

Santa Cruz (also called Milunga ) is a city and a county in Angola. The municipality had a population of 50,596 in 2014.

== History ==
Santa Cruz was one of the first objectives of the independence movement UPA (União das Populações do Norte de Angola, from 1962 FNLA), which began in March 1961, the Portuguese colonial war in Angola. The popular resistance of the local population, which consisted largely of Portuguese settlers, was propagated by Portuguese propaganda as a feat against terrorist attacks by insurgents who were sinking abroad.

After Angola's independence in 1975, Santa Cruz, like many other places, abandoned its Portuguese place name and adopted the name of Milunga. Meanwhile, the city is usually called again Santa Cruz.

== Administration ==
Santa Cruz is the seat of a district of the same name ( Município ) in the province of Uíge. The county has 77,779 inhabitants (projected estimate 2014). The 2014 census should now provide secured population data.

Four communities (Comunas) form the district of Santa Cruz:

- Macocola
- Macolo
- Massau
- Santa Cruz (also Milunga)
