= Nova Esperança =

Nova Esperança may refer to:

- Nova Esperança, Paraná
- Nova Esperança do Sul, a municipality in the state Rio Grande do Sul, Brazil
- Nova Esperança do Piriá
- Nova Esperança (Uíge), a town and commune in Angola
- Nova Esperança, Belas, Luanda, Angola
- Centro Esportivo Nova Esperança, a football team in Campo Grande, Brasil
- New Hope (Macau), a political party in the Chinese Special Administrative Region of Macau
