= Protestantism in Angola =

Religious documentation

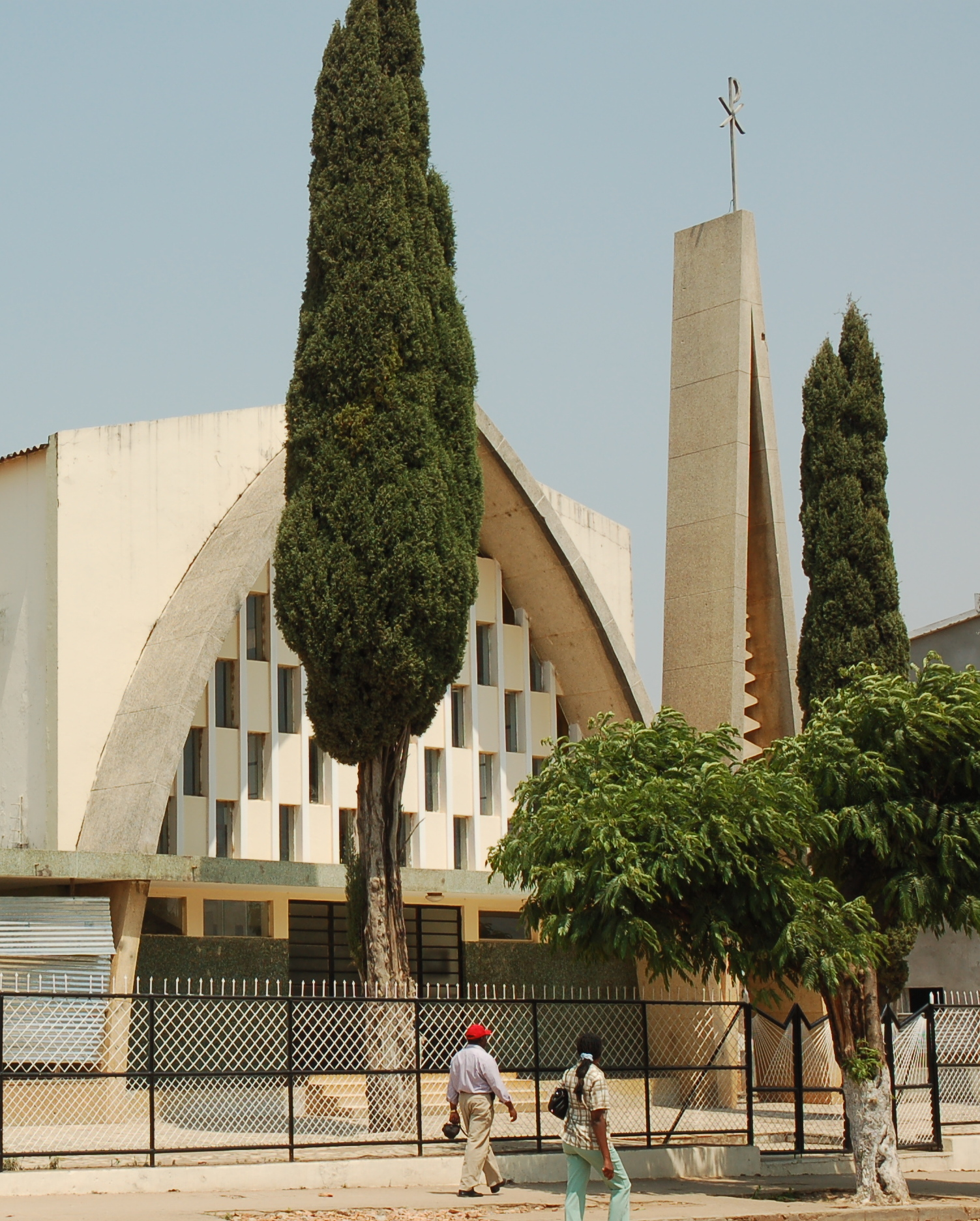
Seventh-day Adventist central church, Huambo, Angola

The population of Angola is more than 92% Christian as of 2023.

== History ==
The Protestant faith was introduced to Angola in 1878 by Baptist missionaries. This was almost 400 years after a Catholic mission had been established there.

Missionary groups in the 1880s included the English Baptist Missionary Society, the American Board of Commissioners for Foreign Missions, the United Church of Canada, the Methodist Episcopal Church and the Brethren's Mission.

Many of the nationalist independence leaders were raised as Protestants, including Agostinho Neto (Methodist), Holden Roberto (Baptist) and Jonas Savimbi (Congregational).

== 21st century ==
The last census in 2014 noted that 24.4% of the population were Protestant or Pentecostal. Estimates in 2022 suggested that 38% of the population are now Protestant.

In 2021, the largest Protestant groups included Baptists in Luanda and the northwest of the country, Lutherans in the south, Methodists, Adventists, New Apostolic Christians and Jehovah's Witnesses, as well as new communities such as the Igréja Unida do Reino de Deus (United Church of the Kingdom of God).

The government of Angola recognizes 11 Protestant denominations:

- Assembly of God,
- Baptist Convention of Angola,
- Baptist Evangelical Church in Angola,
- Evangelical Congregational Church in Angola,
- Evangelical Church of Angola,
- Evangelical Church of South-West Angola,
- Evangelical Reformed Church in Angola,
- Our Lord Jesus Christ Church in the World (Kimbanguist),
- Presbyterian Church of Angola
- Seventh-day Adventist Church
- Union of Evangelical Churches in Angola
- United Methodist Church
