= Independent Presbyterian Church =

Independent Presbyterian Church may refer to:

- Independent Presbyterian Church (Birmingham, Alabama)
- Independent Presbyterian Church of Brazil
- Independent Presbyterian Church in Kenya
- Independent Presbyterian Church (Savannah, Georgia)
- Independent Presbyterian Church of Myanmar
- Independent Presbyterian Church in Angola
- Independent Presbyterian Church in Mexico
- Independent Presbyterian Church (Memphis, Tennessee)
