= Sanza Pombo Airport =

Airport in Angola

- IATA: none; ICAO: FNPB

Summary
- Airport type: Public
- Serves: Sanza Pombo
- Elevation AMSL: 3,251 ft / 991 m
- Coordinates: 7°17′20″S 15°55′50″E

Map
- Location of Sanza Pombo Airport in Angola

Runways
Direction	Length		Surface
Direction	m	ft	Surface
08/26	1,260	4,134	Grass
- Source: Landings.com HERE/Nokia Maps GCM

Sanza Pombo Airport (ICAO: FNPB) is a public use airport serving Sanza Pombo, a town in Uíge Province, Angola. The runway is 7.5 kilometres (4.7 mi) northwest of the town.

Recent construction may have lengthened the usable runway out to approximately 1,400 metres (4,600 ft).

== See also ==
- List of airports in Angola
- Transport in Angola
