= Alto Cauale =

- Municipality and town
- Location in Angola
- Coordinates: 7°58′S 15°52′E
- Country: Angola
- Province: Uíge Province

Area
  - Total: 3,064 km^{2} (1,183 sq mi)

Population (2006)
  - Total: 104,000
- Time zone: UTC+1 (WAT)

Alto Cauale (Portuguese spelling) or Alto Kawale (Bantu spelling) is a town and municipality in Uíge Province in Angola.

The municipality covers an area of 3 064 km ² and as of 2006 had an estimated population of 104,000. It is border to the north by Sanz Pombo, the east by the municipality of Massango, the south by the municipality of Calandula, and west by the municipalities of Camabatela, Negage and Puri. It consists of the communes of Cangola, Bengo and Caiongo.
