= Cangola =

- commune
- Location in Angola
- Coordinates: 7°58′S 15°52′E
- Country: Angola
- Province: Uíge Province
- Municipality: Alto Cauale

Population (2014 Census)
  - Total: 53,720
- Time zone: UTC+1 (WAT)

Cangola is an Angolan town and commune that is located in the province of Uíge. It is part of the municipality Alto Cauale. The commune had a population of 53,720 in 2014.
