= José Aníbal Lopes Rocha =

Angolan politician

Personal details
- Born: July 12, 1948 (age 77) Macocola, Uíge
- Political party: Popular Movement for the Liberation of Angola

José Anibal Lopes Rocha was the Angolan minister for territorial administration in the 1994 government of Jose Eduardo dos Santos.

Political offices
Preceded by Domingos Mutaleno	Provincial Commissioner of Zaire; 1988–1991	Succeeded by Zeferino Estêvão Juliana
Preceded by Jeremias Dumbo	Provincial Commissioner of Uíge; 1991–1994	Succeeded by Serafim Cananito Alexandre
Preceded by António Paulo Cassoma	Minister of Territory Administration; 1994–1997	Succeeded by
Preceded by Justino José Fernandes	Governor of Luanda; 1997–2002	Succeeded by Simão Mateus Paulo
Preceded by José Amaro Tati	Governor of Cabinda; 2002–2009	Succeeded by Mawete João Baptista
