= The Church of Jesus Christ of Latter-day Saints in Angola =

- Area: Africa South
- Members: 8,779 (2025)
- Stakes: 2
- Districts: 3
- Wards: 13
- Branches: 20
- Total congregations: 33
- Missions: 1
- Temples: 1 announced
- FamilySearch Centers: 2

The Church of Jesus Christ of Latter-day Saints in Angola refers to the Church of Jesus Christ of Latter-day Saints and its members in Angola. The first branch (small congregation) was organized in 1996 with fewer than 100 members. As of year-end 2025, there were 8,779 members in 33 congregations.

Membership in Angola
Year	Membership
1989	25
1999	107
2004	621
2009	831
2014	1,684
2019	3,490
2024	7,321
2025	8,779
*Membership was published as a rounded number.

== History ==
A brief history can be found at LDS Newsroom (Angola) or Deseret News 2010 Church Almanac (Country Information: Angola)

== Stakes and Districts ==
As of November 2025, the following were located in Angola
Green = Stake
Orange = District
Purple = Meetinghouse not part of a stake or district

Stake/District	Organized	Mission
Luanda Angola Stake	2 Dec 2018	Angola Luanda South
Viana Angola Stake	10 Dec 2023	Angola Luanda North
Huambo Angola District	21 Nov 2021	Angola Luanda North
Lubango Angola District	23 Jun 2024	Angola Luanda South
Menongue Angola District	22 Jun 2025	Angola Luanda South

Congregations in Angola not part of a stake or district include

- Benguela Branch (Angola Luanda South Mission)
- Cuito Branch (Angola Luanda North Mission)
- Malanje 1st Branch (Angola Luanda North Mission)
- Malanje 2nd Branch (Angola Luanda North Mission)
- Moçâmedes Branch (Angola Luanda South Mission)
- Ondjiva Branch (Angola Luanda South Mission)
- Angola Luanda North Dispersed Members Unit
- Angola Luanda North Dispersed Members Unit

The Dispersed Members Units serves Families and individuals not in proximity of a meetinghouse. Congregations not part of a stake are called branches, regardless of size. The Angola Luanda North Missions also covers the São Tomé Branch in São Tomé and Príncipe.

== Missions ==
The Luanda Angola Mission was created on July 1, 2013 and encompasses all of Angola and Sao Tome and Principe.

Mission	Organized
Angola Luanda North Mission	11 November 2026
Luanda Angola South Mission	1 July 2013

== Temples ==
Angola was located in the Johannesburg South Africa Temple District as of October 2023.

On October 1, 2023, the Luanda Angola Temple was announced.

334. Luanda Angola Temple (Announced); Official website; News & images	
Location: Announced:	Luanda, Angola; 1 October 2023 by Russell M. Nelson

== See also ==
- Religion in Angola
- Christianity in Angola
