= Alto Zaza =

Coordinates: 6°37′S 16°56′E

- commune
- Location in Angola
- Country: Angola
- Province: Uíge
- Elevation: 2,162 ft (659 m)
- Time zone: UTC+1 (WAT)

Alto Zaza is a town and commune in Angola, located in the province of Uíge.

Its unique feature identifier is 2857918 while its unique name identifier is 3997092.

== See also ==
- Communes of Angola
