= Aldeia Viçosa =

Coordinates: 8°06′S 14°58′E

- commune
- Location in Angola
- Country: Angola
- Province: Uíge
- Time zone: UTC+1 (WAT)

Aldeia Viçosa is a town and commune of Angola, located in the province of Uíge.

The town does not have running water or electricity, and runs on lamp posts powered by solar panels that work at night.

- Communes of Angola
