= Cambamba =

Village in Uíge Province, Angola

Coordinates: 8.664°S 15.182°E

Cambamba is a village, as well as the name of a commune in Angola. It is situated in the Uíge Province.
