= Aldina Matilde Barros da Lomba =

Angolan politician

Aldina da Lomba

Governor of Cabinda
- In office 2012–2017
- Preceded by: Mawete João Baptista
- Succeeded by: Eugénio Laborinho

Personal details
- Born: May 12, 1964 (age 61) Cabinda, Cabinda
- Party: MPLA

Aldina Matilde Barros da Lomba is an Angolan politician for MPLA and a member of the National Assembly of Angola.
