= Maquela do Zombo =

Municipality and town in Uíge, Angola

- Municipality & Town
- Location in Angola
- Coordinates: 06°03′S 15°07′E
- Country: Angola
- Province: Uíge Province

Area
  - Total: 7,413 km^{2} (2,862 sq mi)

Population
  - Estimate (2019): 146,908
  - Density: 20/km^{2} (52/sq mi)
- Time zone: UTC+1 (WAT)

Maquela do Zombo is a town, with a population of 42,000 (2014 census), and a municipality, with a population of 127,351 (2014 census), in Uíge Province in Angola.
