= Cuilo Pombo =

Coordinates: 7°12′S 15°43′E

- commune
- Location in Angola
- Country: Angola
- Province: Uíge
- Time zone: UTC+1 (WAT)

Cuilo Pombo is a town and commune of Angola, located in the province of Uíge.

== See also ==
- Communes of Angola
