= Islam in Angola =

Angola is a predominantly Christian country with Islam being a minority religion. As of 2014 census, there are 195,000 Muslims in Angola, representing less than 1% of total population. Most Muslims in Angola are Sunni. They are generally foreign migrants from West Africa and the Middle East, although a few are local converts. There exist several Islamic organizations that run mosques, schools, and community centers. The Association of the Development of Islam in Angola is the primary proselytizing organization. Muslim Angolans are represented by the Supreme Council of Angolan Muslims of Luanda. As of 2020, the Angolan government does not legally recognize any Muslim organizations; as a result, mosques in the country have faced restrictions and many have been shut down by the government.

== Legal status ==
The 2010 Angolan Constitution guarantees freedom of religion to all of its citizens. In late 2016, however, messages spread that the Angolan government had banned Islam and closed down all mosques in the country, stating that it clashed with the state's Christian values. The U.S. State Department's 2013 report into global religious freedom counted 194 different religious groups that were denied legal recognition, the large majority of which were Christian organisations, and this included Islam. The U.S. report does say a mosque was destroyed—including one in Luanda's Zango neighbourhood—though, while it says two mosques were shut down, 52 churches were closed in the same year.

The government requires religious groups to petition for legal status. Upon recognition, these groups are allowed to build schools and places of worship. In order to be recognized, a group must have more than 100,000 and be present in 12 out of 18 provinces. The population of Muslims, however, is estimated at only 90,000. While the government has given legal status to 83 religious groups (all of them Christian), it has not given legal status to any Muslim groups. The president of the Islamic Community of Angola has criticized Angola's threshold for recognition by stating: "You need 100,000 to be recognised as a religion or officially you cannot pray".

The U.S. State Department reports that the government often permits non-registered groups to exist and function, but notes instances of Angolan authorities shutting down mosques.

In November 2013, Angolan Foreign Minister Georges Rebelo Chikoti said that there were eight Islamic denominations in Angola, but none met the legal requirements for registration, and "so they can't practice their faith until concluding the process". Chikoti states that some Muslim groups had not registered their mosques officially, but did not specify which legal requirements they had not met.

== Demographics ==
Historically, Angola did not have a significant Muslim population. During the 21st century, Angola's Muslim community has grown. Most Muslims in Angola are businessmen and migrants from West Africa and the Middle East, especially Lebanon. Very few Angolans have converted to Islam as a result of Muslim missionary activity in Angola. Most of these conversions occurred during the Angolan civil war, when many Angolans fled to countries with a significant Muslim presence and came into contact with Islam there.

Adebayo Oyebade estimates that Muslims make up 1–2.5 percent of Angola's population. The U.S. State Department states that the estimated Muslim population is 80,000–90,000, but notes that some sources put the population size closer to 500,000, which appears to be highly unrealistic. Around 1% of the Muslim population of Angola adheres to Shia Islam.

== Restrictions on mosques ==
The International Religious Freedom Report stated that the Angolan government selectively shut down mosques, schools and community centres. Angolan officials denied that a government had a policy to close mosques, there were reports of local authorities closing mosques or preventing their construction on several occasions.

In July 2010, unidentified arsonists set fire to a mosque in Huambo, causing extensive damage. A Muslim leader later said the mosque was burned: "a day after authorities had warned us that we should not have built the mosque where we had and that it had to be built somewhere else".

On September 4, 2010, authorities closed a mosque in Cazenga without prior notice or justification. The mosque reopened a month later.

In November 2011, Angolan authorities tore down a structure being used as a mosque in Cacuaco without notice and without a written order of violation. In December 2011, a Muslim group in the Malanje Province purchased some land, and applied to obtain permission to build a mosque. The Muslim group repeatedly asked the authorities to either grant or deny the application, but received no response. After waiting several months, when the Muslim group began construction, Angolan authorities arrived and destroyed the mosque foundation. The authorities did not provide either a denial of the application, or a citation for offense.

In January 2012, the Angolan government prevented Muslims from building a mosque in Dundo, Lunda Norte Province, even though the Muslim group had a license to do so. In May 2012, the police chained the doors of a building used by Muslims as a mosque and told them to cease praying there. Muslim leaders wrote letters in response, but received no response.

According to the Islamic Community of Angola, a total of 60 mosques, mostly outside of Luanda, had been shut down in 2013. Voice of America reported seeing a video that showed the demolition of a mosque in Saurimo. Muslims are currently de facto are denied the permit to pray in or build mosques.

Angolan Minister of Culture said: "The legalization of Islam has not been approved [...] their mosques will be closed until further notice". The Angolan Embassy in the United States said it was not aware of this remark. A spokesperson for the Angolan police said that he was unaware of any government order to shut down mosques. However, Voice of America found a government document telling an official to demolish the "Zango 1" mosque in Viana, Luanda Province.

== "Ban on Islam" controversy ==
In November 2013, some media sources reported that Islam and other belief systems deemed to be contrary to the country's culture had been outlawed in Angola. However, the reports were later denied by the government after encountering scrutiny. The Ministry of Culture stated: "There is no war in Angola against Islam or any other religion". At the time, Ekmeleddin İhsanoğlu, Secretary-General of the Organisation of Islamic Cooperation (OIC), said that his organisation would send a fact-finding team to Angola.

Due to events based on the controversy, Western far-right fake news outlets routinely circulate the inaccurate claim that Angola "banned" Islam and utilize said claims to demonize Muslims, an example being a claim form the America First Patriots that: [...] Maybe the USA could learn a thing or two from Angola".

== See also ==
- Glossary of Islam
- Outline of Islam
- Index of Islam-related articles
- Religion in Angola
- Demographics of Angola
