= Mawete João Baptista =

Angolan politician (born 1968)

Personal details
- Born: 20 March 1968 (age 58)
- Party: Popular Movement for the Liberation of Angola

Mawete João Baptista (born 20 March 1948) is an Angolan former ambassador and provincial governor.

Political offices
Preceded by	Ambassador of Angola to Algeria -1980	Succeeded by João Arnaldo Saraiva de Carvalho
Preceded by –	Ambassador of Angola to Cuba; 1980-1985	Succeeded by Manuel Pedro Pacavira
Preceded by França Van-Dúnem	Ambassador of Angola to Portugal; 1985-1989	Succeeded by Rui Mingas
Preceded by Armindo do Espírito Santo Vieira	Ambassador of Angola to Italy; 1989-1993	Succeeded by Antero de Abreu
Preceded by Felisberto Monimambu	Ambassador of Angola to the D.R.C. 1998-2008	Succeeded by Emílio José de Carvalho Guerra
Preceded by António Bento Cangulo	Governor of Uíge; 2008–2009	Succeeded by Paulo Pombolo
Preceded by Aníbal Rocha	Governor of Cabinda; 2009–2012	Succeeded by Aldina da Lomba
