= Quitexe =

- Municipality & Town
- Location in Angola
- Coordinates: 07.9433°S 15.0434°E
- Country: Angola
- Province: Uíge

Population (2014 Census)
  - Total: 34,297
- Time zone: UTC+1 (WAT)

Quitexe is a town and municipality in Uíge Province in Angola. The municipality had a population of 34,297 in 2014.
