= Songo, Angola =

Songo
- Municipality and town
- Location in Angola
- Coordinates: 7°14′S 14°19′E
- Country: Angola
- Province: Uíge Province

Population (2014 Census)
  - Municipality and town: 61,682
  - Urban: 31,382
- Time zone: UTC+1 (WAT)

Songo is a town and a municipality in Uíge Province in Angola. The municipality had a population of 61,682 in 2014.
