= Quimbele =

- Municipality and town
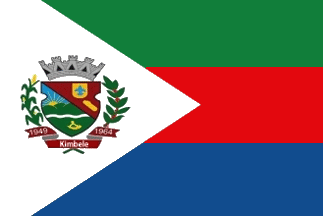
- Flag

- Location in Angola
- Coordinates: 6°31′S 16°13′E
- Country: Angola
- Province: Uíge Province

Population (2014 Census)
  - Total: 136,496
- Time zone: UTC+1 (WAT)

Quimbele is a town and municipality in Uíge Province in Angola. The municipality had a population of 136,496 in 2014.
