= Architecture of Angola =

The architecture of Angola spans three distinct historical periods: precolonial, colonial and independent. The impact of Portuguese colonial control over Angola has left a large architectural legacy in the country. However, present-day Angola is increasingly influenced by broader global trends in architecture, especially as a result of the country's oil boom in the early 21st Century.

== The unique and distinctive architectural style of Angola’s cinemas ==
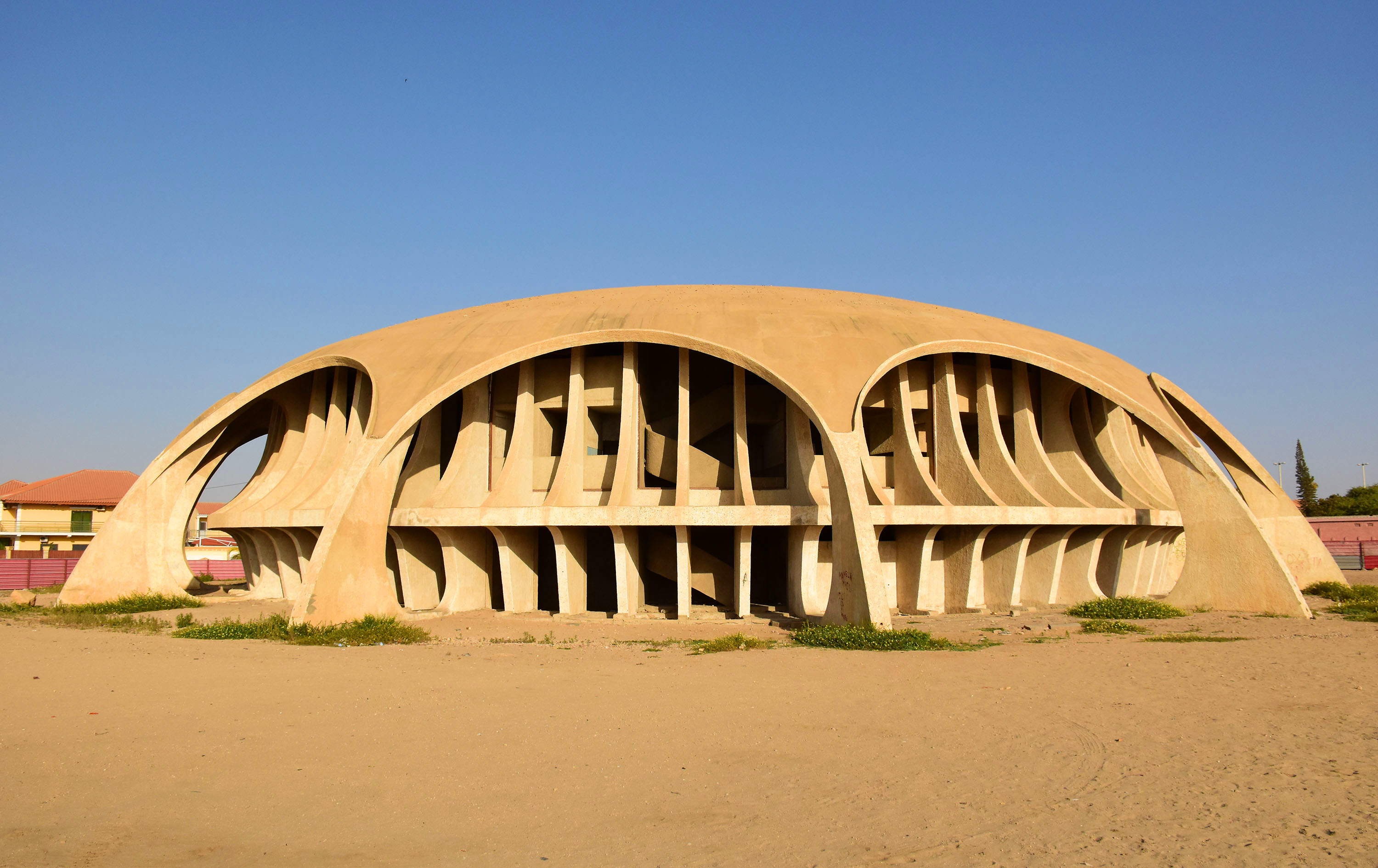
Cinema in Moçâmedes

Although the film-making industry in Angola has never been famous, by 1975, there were 50 cinemas in the country. Cinemas can be considered landmark buildings in some countries and cultures. Although the film itself may be the only important element in many cultures, many african countries realize the cinemas themselves, the actual structures, are also meaningful. Since the end of the war in 2002, when the oil boom broke out, the redevelopment and reconstruction of Angola have been a subject of rising praise and lamentation for Africa. However, cultural space and historical heritage have not been well developed in general.

The Goethe-Institut in Angola wants to restore the National Cinema, and they are researching prominent cinemas. The campaign aims is to protect Angolan cinemas, which can be regarded as national cultural heritage buildings, and being modern, they attract foreign visitors. The campaign began with a resumption of free fiction in the form of a photo coffee table book by Walter Fernandes and Miguel Hurst. With this, Angola has found a new development point for the appreciation of cinema. The architects Maria Alice Correia, F. Joao Guimaraes, and Paula Nascimento. The design of Cine-esplanda has opened up a new chapter for cinema in Angola. Nascimento believes restoring the functional mode of cinema is just as important as restoring architectural form. To best represent the developed world of the film industry, some theater operators use stock images from Film Atlantico taken at the Luanda International Film Festival, or the film Cazenga Movie Renovation of “Assaults in Luanda II” in 2008, producing a kind of Musseques cinema. Compared with a vivid exhibition, this genre of cinema is dull. Of course, sometimes absence also exists in film. The Musseques Cinema was the largest functional cinema in the late colonial period, and now the building is used for the post-independence parliament. The Musseques Cinema employed a narrow range of project operations, political and economic power, existing to a large extent as members of the MPLA. Images, symbols, and colours appear in some photographs to show that film space is more often used by political committees than for cultural purposes or to hold public meetings. However, there will never be a lack of film space. The comments of Angola' celebrity, Jose Mena, Abrantes on Angolan films also apply to cinemas, whose "past deserves a better present"

== Angola’s housing ==
When the civil war ended in Angola, President Jose Eduardo Dos Santos of Angola built one million homes. Because most of the country's houses were destroyed due to the long civil war, the people at that time had serious housing shortages. A total of 100,000 hectares of land near Luanda, Benguela, Namibe, Lubango and Malange were planned for housing, and the projects were mostly contracted by Chinese companies. Kilamba is a superstar city with 710 buildings and 20,000 apartments built in September 2012. In the first stage, 28 urban blocks were built. The northeast of North Luanda provides accommodation for nearly thirty thousand people. In 2009, the Housing Development Fund was set up by the Angolan government to help provide low-income families with social housing. However, FFH investments are targeted only at government workers in national housing projects, such as in the new city of Kiramba. The loan is extended for 30 years at a rate of 3%.

To help more people, in 2013, the government introduced a subsidized rent-buy program for people with jobs and national citizenship through Sonangol Imobiliaria e-owned (SONIP), a real estate company owned by the state oil company. At the very beginning, apartments in these projects were priced between $125 thousand and $200 thousand. However, these housing programs do not really address the cost of living because most of these housing projects are far from the city. Public transport is not very developed, which means that many residents rely on expensive private transport. [6] Although the government still gives priority to state-funded housing construction, budget constraints caused by the global economic recession continue to limit the government's ability to invest its own resources for the development of housing. To raise funds to continue the government's housing programme, the State established the Housing Development Assets Fund (FADEH). These initiatives, as well as promotion for public-private partnerships and the task force set up to enhance private sector participation in the national urbanism implementation and housing provision, mark opportunities for housing financiers and users along supply chain for housing. Future legal changes in the field of land and property should promote private sector investment and generate taxes that can be used to improve the housing sector. So far, housing finance and development initiatives have barely affected the lower-income segments of the population, despite the existence of the housing development fund and the legislative system governing cooperatives and microfinance institutions. In addition, most of the initiatives are limited to the capital and major urban areas of the country. The best practices developed by Kixicredit and other old companies provide opportunities for building and further expansion.

== Churches in Angola ==
Between 1641 and 1648, Bengo, a national monument, was built. This shrine for mutineers offers housing for thousands of pilgrims, specifically at the time of the mutineers' feast, in September. Benguela has several churches such as the Popovite church, whose baroque style is listed as a national monument. The building has a nave, two corridors, a chapel, two towers, a baptistery and a choir. It also boasts 1748 stained glass windows. On the inside is Brazilian wood carving and the pulpit, which is done in a rococo style, that is found only in Angola. In 2009, the church accepted stained glass that had been on display for more than four years.

The province of Cabinda has some of the strongest religious beliefs in Angola. Within the province, there is the old episcopal cathedral of the 16th century. Additionally, this is where the Church of the Lang Dana (21st century), the Church of the World's Queen, the Church of the Unsullied Conception, the Chapel of Choa, the Church of Mbomka, and the Church of St. Anthony can be found. The Church of St. Tiago is on the hilltop that controls the village of Randana. Gothic revival plans classified this church by colonial rule as "property of the public interest”. In the northern province of Kwanza, North Kwanza is the location of the Virgin of Victory church. In several such churches and chapels, the viaduct leads to the other church, which is rock-solid and tiled. It is rich in ornaments and has a famous reputation and a good image. The latter supported by powerful buttresses and spectacular bell towers from 1938 and still stand even today. Angola's first governor was buried there in 1589. Rebuilt in the 17th century, it has been a national monument since 1923. In South Kwanza, the Church of St. Kangba in the southern Guanza province, replaced by Serra and then later by Waco Kungo, is almost a faithful replica of the church of St. Kangba, built in Portugal 200 years ago. Despite the significant damage to the attic and the exterior walls caused by the civil war, the buildings have been properly restored. Additionally, Sambis and Porto Ambohm also still stand. [7] Next to the Rock of the Angel, Sambis and Porto Ambohm can be traced back to the eighteenth-century San Joseph Church. Santa Rita of Cassia, the largest refugee camp in Angola, was opened in April 2013. In Mbanza, Congo is one of Zaire's largest cultural assets and is now the Cathedral of Kurbibi. Between May 6, and July 6, 1941, construction began on the Kula Bibi church. Because of its rare architectural form, the site has attracted the interest of experts at home and abroad. Angola claims it is the oldest church, which shows the historical progress of Angola in Sub-Saharan Africa. It was promoted to a cathedral in 1596, and in 1992 Pope John Poulos visited it.
