= International rankings of Angola =

These are the international rankings of Angola.

== International rankings ==
Organization	Survey	Ranking
Institute for Economics and Peace	Global Peace Index	100 out of 144
United Nations Development Programme	Human Development Index	143 out of 182
CIA World Factbook	Central bank discount rate(%)	2 out of 172
CIA World Factbook	GDP per capita	126 out of 170
Transparency International	Corruption Perceptions Index	162 out of 180
World Intellectual Property Organization	Global Innovation Index, 2026	136 out of 139
