= List of ecoregions in Angola =

The following is a list of ecoregions in Angola, according to the Worldwide Fund for Nature (WWF).

== Terrestrial ecoregions ==
by major habitat type

=== Tropical and subtropical moist broadleaf forests ===
- Atlantic Equatorial coastal forests

=== Tropical and subtropical dry broadleaf forests ===
- Zambezian Cryptosepalum dry forests

=== Tropical and subtropical grasslands, savannas, and shrublands ===
- Angolan miombo woodlands
- Angolan mopane woodlands
- Central Zambezian miombo woodlands
- Southern Congolian forest–savanna mosaic
- Western Congolian forest–savanna mosaic
- Western Zambezian grasslands

=== Flooded grasslands and savannas ===
- Zambezian flooded grasslands

=== Montane grasslands and shrublands ===
- Angolan montane forest–grassland mosaic
- Angolan scarp savanna and woodlands

=== Deserts and xeric shrublands ===
- Kaokoveld desert
- Namibian savanna woodlands

=== Mangroves ===
- Central African mangroves

== Freshwater ecoregions ==
by bioregion

=== West Coastal Equatorial ===
- Southern West Coastal Equatorial

=== Congo ===
- Kasai
- Lower Congo

=== Cuanza ===
- Cuanza

=== Zambezi ===
- Etosha
- Namib Coastal
- Zambezi
  - Upper Zambezi Floodplains
  - Zambezian Headwaters
- Okavango Floodplains

== Marine ecoregions ==
- Angolan
- Namib
