= Independent Presbyterian Church in Angola =

Church in Angola

The Independent Presbyterian Church in Angola was founded by Angolan refugees who returned from Congo and identified themselves with the Presbyterian Community in Kinshasa. When they returned they decided to form an independent denomination in 1991, based in their spiritual experience in Zaire. It has 1,052 members 4 congregations and 10 house fellowships, 2 Presbyteries, a Synod and a General Assembly. Recently it united with the Presbyterian Church of Angola.
