= Ambuila =

- Municipality and town
- Location in Angola
- Coordinates: 7°26′S 14°39′E
- Country: Angola
- Province: Uíge Province

Area
  - Total: 2,253 km^{2} (870 sq mi)

Population (2024 Census)
  - Total: 21,499
  - Density: 9.542/km^{2} (24.71/sq mi)
- Time zone: UTC+01:00 (WAT)

Ambuila is a town and municipality in Uíge Province in Angola. The municipality had a population of 21,499 in 2024.
