= Military history of Angola =

The military history of Angola is marked by a series of conflicts rooted in tribal conflicts, colonialism and the Cold War. During the Cold War, Angola was involved in struggles between Western powers and South Africa with the help of the Soviet Union and Cuba.

== Establishment of Angola Colony ==
In 1655 the Portuguese Empire established its colony in present-day Angola with the help of the Kingdom of Kongo. During this time period the relation of the Portuguese Empire with the Kingdom of Kongo lead to conflicts that would weaken Kongo.

The Battle of Mbwila was a small war between the Portuguese Empire in Angola against the Kingdom of Kongo. Despite the size of the conflict, the death of António I of Kongo by the Portuguese lead to the Kongo Civil War.

The Angolan kingdoms of the late 16th century, such as Ndongo, relied on a mix of professional soldiers and civilian call-ups. Hand-to-hand combat was dominant in battles of the era, using swords, clubs, battleaxes, and stabbing spears.

== Kongo Civil War ==
The Kongo Civil War was an internal conflict between rival House of Kinlaza against the House of Kimpanzuof in the Kingdom of Kongo. Numerous other factions got involved in the conflict including the Portuguese Empire. By the end of the war, Kongo's vaunted capital had been destroyed and many BaKongo were sold into the Trans-Atlantic slave trade.

== Colonial era ==
In its time as a Portuguese colony, the military forces in Angola consisted of a small group of Portuguese soldiers, largely convicts, augmented by local Angolans as needed. Military service in Angola had a poor reputation among the Portuguese compared to Brazil or Asia, with bad pay, limited opportunities for advancement, and high mortality. Native African auxiliaries were recruited to fill the army, and viewed as cannon fodder by the Portuguese. They comprised a mix of forcibly conscripted men and paid mercenaries.

== Angolan War of Independence ==
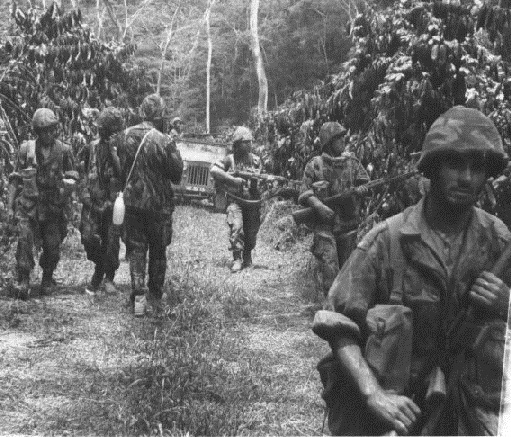
Portuguese troops on patrol in Angola

The Angolan War of Independence was a conflict from 1961 until 1974. It was the first of a series of wars that would be known as the Portuguese Colonial Wars. The conflict was fought by Angolan rebels against the Portuguese Armed Forces. The rebels received aid from the Soviet Union while the Portuguese Armed Forces received military support from South Africa.

=== Rise of MPLA ===
The MPLA flag

The Popular Movement for the Liberation of Angola (MPLA) was established in 1956 when the Angolan Communist Party (PCA) merged with the Party of the United Struggle for Africans in Angola (PLUAA). It is, as of 2020, the ruling party of Angola.

The MPLA played a major role in country's struggle during the Angolan War of Independence. After independence, MPLA fought a civil war against the National Union for the Total Independence of Angola (UNITA) and National Liberation Front of Angola (FNLA) from 1975 to 2002.

=== Foreign support ===
During the Angolan War of Independence many communist and African nations supported the rebels. The Cuban Military was heavily involved in the conflict aiding the MPLA. However, during the Angolan Civil War the Cuban Military would aid the MPLA while other nations such as the People's Republic of China and Zaire would support UNITA and the FNLA.

== South African Border War ==
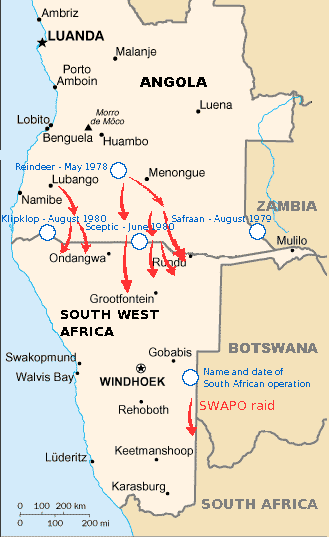
SWAPO's and South Africa's operations (1978-1980)

The South African Border War was a war between the South West Africa People's Organization (SWAPO), Angola, Cuba and the USSR on one side, and apartheid-South Africa together with UNITA on the other side, in the territory of South-West Africa and southern Angola from 1965 until 1989. South Africa captured the territory of present-day Namibia from Germany during World War I, and retained it as colonial territory until 1989. SWAPO was attempting to take power in the post-colonial Namibia. The conflict was intertwined with the Angolan Civil War, and was a proxy war of the Cold War between the USSR (supporting Angola and SWAPO) and the US (who supported UNITA and South Africa). The conflict ended with the collapse of the USSR, with both Angola and South Africa removing their troops, and Namibia becoming an independent state.

== Angolan Civil War ==
The Angolan Civil War was a conflict that plagued the country from the beginning of its independence until 2002. The war was the longest running conflict in Africa and claimed the lives of a million people. The conflict was between the communist MPLA and Cuba against FNLA and UNITA, who in turn received support and assistance from the US via South Africa and Zaire.

The United States and the Soviet Union downplayed their involvement due to their own military problems in Vietnam and Afghanistan, and they participated through their various proxies only, although several USSR officers were killed and captured in Angola by the South Africans. Cuba was the only major non-African nation to openly intervene in this conflict. The war ended with an international agreement in which the MPLA and UNITA agreed to hold democratic elections.
