= Caiongo =

- commune
- Country: Angola
- Province: Uíge
- Time zone: UTC+1 (WAT)

Caiongo is a town and commune of Angola, located in the province of Uíge.

== See also ==
- Communes of Angola
