= Bembe, Angola =

Bembe
- Municipality and town
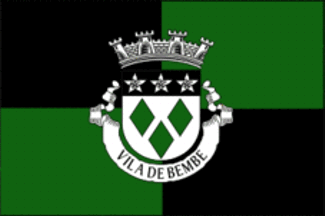
- Flag

- Location in Angola
- Coordinates: 7°06′S 14°27′E
- Country: Angola
- Province: Uíge Province

Area
  - Total: 2,183 sq mi (5,655 km^{2})

Population (2014 Census)
  - Total: 32,955
  - Density: 15.09/sq mi (5.828/km^{2})
- Time zone: UTC+1 (WAT)

Bembe is a town and municipality in Uíge Province in Angola. The municipality had a population of 32,955 in 2014.

In the mid-19th century Bembe was a center of mining by the Portuguese colonial government and one of the points of contact with the rulers of the Kingdom of Kongo.
