= Buengas =

- Municipality and town
- Location in Angola
- Coordinates: 6°44′S 15°54′E
- Country: Angola
- Province: Uíge Province

Population (2014 Census)
  - Total: 57,248
- Time zone: UTC+1 (WAT)

Buengas is a town and municipality in Uíge Province in Angola. The municipality had a population of 57,248 in 2014.
