= Uíge Province =

Province of Angola

Coordinates: 7°37′S 15°03′E

Uíge Wizidi
- Province
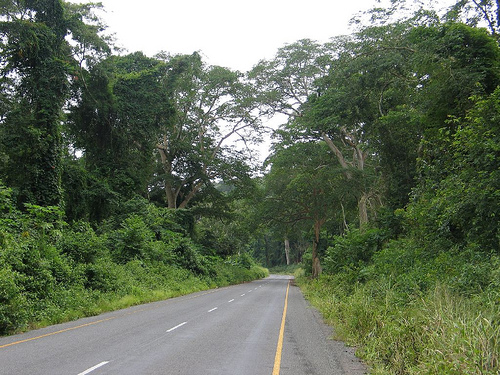
- Caxito-Uíge Road

- Map of Angola with the Uíge province highlighted
- Country: Angola
- Alvor Agreement: 15 January 1975
- Capital: Uíge

Government
  - Governor: Jose Carvalho da Rocha
  - Vice-Governor for the Political, Economic and Social Sector: Sonia Arlete Fernandes Domingos
  - Vice-Governor for Technical Services and Infrastructures: Helena da Cruz Vieira Dias Pereira

Area
  - Total: 58,698 km^{2} (22,663 sq mi)

Population (2014 census)
  - Total: 1,483,118
  - Density: 25.267/km^{2} (65.441/sq mi)
- ISO 3166 code: AO-UIG
- HDI (2018): 0.530 low · 10th
- Website: www.uige.ao.gov

Uíge (pronunciation: /wiːdʒ/; Kongo: Wizidi or Wizi) is one of the 21 provinces of Angola, located in the northwestern part of the country. Its capital city is of the same name.

== History ==
During the Middle Ages, the Uíge Province was the heartland of the Kongo Kingdom. The Bakongo North and South of the Kongo river were all part of this Kingdom, a centralized monarchy which for given periods of time also dominated part of the Ambundu further to the South. The kings lived in the city of M'banza-Kongo which had a population of about 50,000 in the 16th century. Knowledge of metallurgy among the Bakongo was renowned; their king was even called the "Blacksmith King". Their reign was first strengthened by the arrival of Portuguese priests who lived at the king's court and taught religion as well as literacy; the interaction with the Portuguese stronghold of Luanda was rather marginal for a long time. Things changed when the Portuguese started to conquer and occupy the hinterland in the 19th century. In the beginning of the 20th century, the Kongo kingdom still existed on paper and the court in M'banza-Kongo was maintained, but had lost any effective power.

In the early part of 20th century the province was on a decline due to its inhospitable terrain and poor accessibility. The situation changed entirely when the Portuguese discovered that soil and climate were favourable to coffee production. The Uíge province (then called "district") became Angola's major centre for coffee production in the 1950s. While part of the production came from European (mostly Portuguese) owned plantations, most producers were Bakongo smallholders; in both cased, they relied on forced or "contract" labour from the Ovimbundu. Its market centre of Uíge town, the district capital, prospered and was designated a city in 1956. To encourage the principle of national integration with Portugal, many towns in Angola were renamed during Portuguese colonial rule, including the provincial capital of Uíge town, which was renamed Vila Marechal Carmona (English: Marshal Carmona Town) after Marshal Óscar Carmona, the former President of Portugal, later simplified as Carmona.

In the 1950s, the Bakongo people were among the forerunners in the independence movement. For part of them, the purpose was to restore their kingdom, but their majority came out in favour of Angola as a whole. They formed first a regional movement, União das Populações do Norte de Angola (union of the people of Northern Angola), then baptized União das Populações de Angola (union of Angolan peoples), and finally the National Front for the Liberation of Angola (Frente Nacional de Libertação de Angola; FNLA), which became one of the three Angolan anti-colonial guerrilla movements fighting the Portuguese forces, during the 1960s.

During the Portuguese rule, the province, and in particular its capital Uíge, became the haven of rebel activity (its inaccessible wilderness providing the cover for such activity) of the rebels received active support from the leader of its neighbouring country of Congo, Mobutu Sese Seko. Rebels of the União Nacional para a Independência Total de Angola (UNITA) had even occupied the province for short spells during renewed civil war in 1990s. It was only in 2002 there was peace in the region.

Beginning in October 2004 and continuing into 2005, Uíge Province was the centre of an outbreak of Marburg hemorrhagic fever, a disease closely related to Ebola. It was caused by Marburg virus which is an African RNA virus that causes green monkey disease. Now thought to be under control, there were 374 cases with 88% deaths. According to the United Nations, it was, at the time, the world's worst epidemic of any kind of hemorrhagic fever.

== Geography ==
Uíge Province is located in northwestern Angola. It is bounded on the north by the Democratic Republic of Congo, on the west by the Zadi River, east by the Beu river and on the south by Beu town. The land route to enter the province is from Luanda through the province of Bengo. Roads are being built over the hilly terrain to connect with Congo. The main road in the north is the one which crosses the border at Kizenga to reach Kinshasa. A highway connects to Castilo and further on to Luanda. Another southwest highway connects with the provinces of Zaire and Malanje.

The province is drained by many rivers. Cuilo river flows is a popular attraction, as is the Sanza Pombo falls. The lagoon of Luzamba and Muvoio and the lagoon of Sacapate are good for swimming and bathing. Other important rivers in the province are the Zadi River, the Lucala River, the Dange River and the Luvulu River. Only small boats can ply these rivers. The province is characterized by pastoral terrain and rich soil, with an area of 58,698 square kilometres (22,663 sq mi). It has a tropical climate with an annual average temperature reported as 24 °C (75 °F). The province's Beu Forest Reserve covers an area of 1,400 square kilometres (540 sq mi). It is bounded on the north by the Democratic Republic of Congo, on the west by the Zadi, east by the Beu River and on the south by Beu town. Since the Forest Reserve near Beu village is not declared the assistance provided to maintain it is lacking. Hence, the reserve has poor infrastructure and guidance. Among the large mammals, elephants could be sighted here.

== Municipalities ==
The province of Uíge contains sixteen municipalities (Portuguese: municípios):

- Alto Cauale
- Ambuila
- Bembe
- Buengas
- Bungo
- Damba
- Maquela do Zombo (Zombo)
- Milunga (formerly Macocola)
- Mucaba
- Negage
- Puri
- Quimbele
- Quitexe
- Sanza Pombo
- Songo
- Uíge

== Communes ==
The province of Uíge contains the following communes (Portuguese: comunas), sorted by their respective municipalities:

- Alto Cauale Municipality: - Bengo, Caiongo, Cangola
- Ambuila Municipality: – Nova Ambuíla, Quipedro
- Bembe Municipality: – Bembe, Lucunga (Lucanga), Mabaia
- Buengas Municipality: – Buengas, Cuilo-Camboso, Nova Esperança
- Bungo Municipality: – Bungo
- Damba Municipality: – Camatambo, Damba, Lêmboa, Mabanza Sosso (Nsosso), Petecusso
- Maquela do Zombo Municipality: – Beu, Cuilo-Futa, Maquela do Zombo (Zombo), Quibocolo, Sacandica
- Milunga Municipality: – Macocola, Macolo, Massau, Santa Cruz de Milunga
- Mucaba Municipality: – Mucaba, Uando
- Negage Municipality: – Dimuca, Negage, Quisseque
- Puri Municipality: – Puri
- Quimbele Municipality: – Alto Zaza, Cuango, Icoca, Quimbele
- Quitexe Municipality: – Aldeia Viçosa, Cambamba, Quitexe, Vista Alegre
- Sanza Pombo Municipality: – Alfândega, Cuilo Pombo, Sanza Pombo, Uamba
- Songo Municipality: – Kivuenga (Quivuenga), Songo
- Uíge Municipality: – Uíge

== Demographics ==
Uíge has a population 1,426,354. In ethnic terms, its inhabitants are almost exclusively different groups of Bakongo. They speak the Kikongo language.

== Economy ==
The economy of the province is basically of traditional agricultural farming of coffee, beans, cassava, grain, peanuts, cotton, and wood. Plantation and production of coffee contributed largely to the economy of the province and also Angola during colonial times. Coffee production (in Uíge, Luanda, Cuanza Norte and Cuanza Sul provinces of Angola) was started by the Portuguese in 1830s and soon became a cash crop; the popular crop grown was robusta coffee (in its 2000 and odd plantations in Angola, owned mostly by the Portuguese). It was even one of the largest coffee producing country in Africa, in the 1970s. However, the civil war for independence from Portuguese rule devastated the coffee plantations and many coffee agronomists migrated to Brazil and the plantations became wild bushes. However, the rehabilitation of the plantation has started since 2000 but the investment required to replace the 40-year-old unproductive plants are estimated to be US$230 million. With opening up of new roads, industrial activity in the province is taking shape.

Important mineralogical resources which help the economy include copper, silver, and cobalt. Diamonds are also found in the alluvial deposits in the province. The Movoviao –Tetelo-Bembe copper exploration project is located in the province at the border with the Congo Republic. The project has been taken up under a Memorandum of Understanding (MOU) signed in 2008 between Hansa Resources Limited of Canada and Angala Petroleum Services (S.A.R.L). Under this MOU, the Movio copper mine, which was operational between 1937 and 1961 as an open pit and underground mine, is being revived, in addition to the Bembe and Tetelco deposits. Several other minerals, such as cobalt, gold, lead, manganese, silver, vanadium, and zinc, have also been found in this region.

== Landmarks ==
Some of the important monuments in the province are the tomb of Mekabango, and the tomb of king M’Bianda-N Gunga, ruler of the resistance movement. São José church built in the 18th century is also located near Encope rock outcrop. A fort constructed in the 20th century is also located next to the church.

== List of governors ==
Name	Years in office
Hochi Min	1975–1976
Simão Bráz	1976–1977
Ambrósio Lukoki	1977–1978
Massunga Kota	1978–1979
Lanvu Emanuel Norman	1979–1980
Manuel Quarta Punza	1980–1984
Zeferino Estêvão Juliana	1984–1988
Domingos Mutaleno	1988–1989
Jeremias Dumbo	1989–1990
José Aníbal Lopes Rocha	1991–1995
Serafim Cananito Alexandre	1995–1998
Cordeiro Ernesto Nzakundomba	1998–2002
João Domingos Manzaíla	1998–1999
Cordeiro Ernesto Nzakundomba	1999–2002
Lázaro Xixima	2002–2004
António Bento Kangulo	2004–2008
Mawete João Baptista	2008–2009
Paulo Pombolo	2009–2017
Mpinda Simão	2017–2020
Sérgio Luther Rescova Joaquim	2020-2020
José Carvalho da Rocha	2020–

From 1976 to 1991, the official name was Provincial Commissioner.
