= Disability in Angola =

In Angolan law disability is defined as;

Persons with disabilities are all those who, by reason of loss or abnormality, whether congenital or acquired, of psychological, intellectual, physiological, anatomical functions or bodily structures, have specific difficulties that, in conjunction with environmental factors, are likely to restrict or hinder their activities and prevent them from participating on an equal basis with others.

Angola ratified both the Convention on the Rights of Persons with Disabilities and the Optional Protocol to the Convention on the Rights of Persons with Disabilities in May 2014.

Decades long armed conflict after independence in 1975 contributed to disability in the country.

The 2014 General Population and Housing Census found that 2.5% of the population had a physical or mental disability. However the census is seen biased toward war wounded and did not properly count disabilities from other causes. The statistics are also criticized as outdated. Estimate of Angolans injured by land mines and other explosive remnants of war range from 60,000 to 88,000, but the true number may be higher as many casualties are unreported.

Angola first competed at the 1996 Summer Paralympics, and has competed in every edition of the Summer Paralympics since then. The country has never participated in the Winter Paralympic Games.
