= Puri, Angola =

Puri
- Municipality and town
- Location in Angola
- Coordinates: 7°41′S 15°36′E
- Country: Angola
- Province: Uíge Province

Population (2014 Census)
  - Municipality and town: 37,910
  - Urban: 7,598
- Time zone: UTC+1 (WAT)

Puri is a town and municipality in Uíge Province in Angola. The municipality had a population of 37,910 in 2014.
