= Macocola =

- Municipality and town
- Location in Angola
- Coordinates: 6°59′S 16°8′E
- Country: Angola
- Province: Uíge Province
- Time zone: UTC+1 (WAT)

Macocola is a town and municipality in Uíge Province in Angola.
