= Sanza Pombo =

- Municipality & Town
- Location in Angola
- Coordinates: 07°20′S 16°00′E
- Country: Angola
- Province: Uíge Province

Population (2014 Census)
  - Municipality & Town: 68,391
  - Urban: 23,000
- Time zone: UTC+1 (WAT)

Sanza Pombo is a town and a municipality in Uíge Province in Angola. The municipality had a population of 68,391 in 2014.

== Infrastructure ==
Sanza Pombo is served by Sanza Pombo Airport which is 7.5 kilometres (4.7 mi) northwest of the town.
