= Presbyterian Church of Angola =

- Leaf logo of the Presbyterian Church in Angola
- Abbreviation: IPA or PCofA
- Classification: Protestant
- Orientation: conservative Calvinist
- Theology: Reformed Evangelical
- Governance: Presbyterian
- Moderator: Rev. Antonio Bento
- Associations: World Reformed Fellowship (WRF) and the Association of Evangelical Churches in Angola
- Region: in 9 Angolan Provinces out of the 18 Provinces
- Founder: Neves Massaqui
- Origin: 1984; Luanda, Angola
- Separated from: Evangelical Reformed Church in Angola
- Branched from: Presbyterian Church of Brazil
- Merger of: united with the Independent Presbyterian Church in Angola and the Christian Presbyterian Church in Angola in 2012
- Congregations: about 80-100
- Members: 20,000 - 23,000
- Ministers: 51 (2009)

The Presbyterian Church in Angola (In Portuguese the Igreja Presbiteriana de Angola or IPA) is a federation of theologically orthodox Reformed churches, that was founded in the mid-1980s, adopting the Westminster Confession of Faith as the official Standards.

== Origin ==
In the Evangelical Reformed Church in Angola (IERA) has suffered numerous conflicts. In the IERA problems were about the way of exercising the leadership in the church. Pastor Neves Massaqui created the church and has close relations with the Presbyterian Church of Brazil, this fostered the secession as well. The official beginning of the church is on June 9, 1984. There is an agreement of cooperation between the Presbyterian Church of Brazil and the Presbyterian Church in Angola in the fields of evangelism and social issues.

The officially agreement dates back to 1987. The IBP continues watching, supporting the IPA and provides education for pastors and sending teachers to Angola. In the 1980s Rev. Antonio Neves Massaqui came to Brazil and established this partnership. But also several Angolan Presbyterian pastors and ministers are training in Brazilian Seminaries.

The Presbyterian Church in Manaus has involved several years in the mission trips and evangelism in Luanda, Angola.

== Theology ==
The Presbyterian Church in Angola is a conservative Reformed and Presbyterian denomination. The main activities of the church were in Luanda and Uige, the home region of the founder. The denomination adopted the Westminster Confession of Faith as its official confession along with the Apostles Creed.

Organisation of the denomination follows the Presbyterian church government, local congregations, presbyteries, synods, and the highest level is the General Assembly. IPA has the same constitution as the Brazilian Presbyterian Church (IPB).

== Interchurch organisations ==
The denomination is a member of the World Reformed Fellowship as well as the Association of Evangelical Churches of Angola

== Statistics ==
The Presbyterian Church in Angola had 12,000 members and 30 congregations and 50 house fellowships in 2000, and an estimated 23,000 members in 2009.

Presbyterians who were in Congo and returned to the IPA were around 12,500. There are no women ordination. The denomination is present in 9 provinces from the 18 Provinces in Angola. In 2000 it had 51 pastors, that means one pastor per 450 members. Ministers are men only. Church government is Presbyterian-synodal, with presbyteries, Synods and the General Assembly. Official languages are Portuguese and Kikongo.

Due to the union these numbers of members and churches grew rapidly.

In January 2014 Rev Rondinho Antonio Bento said that reinforced house to house evangelisation will continue to help youth to life a socially useful life.

== Recent issues ==
In early 2011 the Independent Presbyterian Church in Angola and the Christian Presbyterian Church in Angola teamed up with the Presbyterian Church in Angola (IPA). The integration of the denomination into one is a result of a long period of dialogue. Both Christian denomination took this decision because they understand that the Presbyterian Church in Angola is a large community not only in Angola, but internationally. Regard to its evolution there was a need of reunification, to integrate everything into one single denomination. The Independent Presbyterian Church in Angola and the Presbyterian Christian Church in Angola integrated with all of their congregations, pastors, elders and deacons into the Presbyterian Church in Angola. This effort was supported by the PC in Angola. The President of the Generas Synod of IPA said that : " The IPA are open to welcome all who are open to and want to a union, to serve better the Lord. The Presbyterian community become stronger in Angola.he pastor Rondinho Antonio Bento, president of the IPA General Synod, he said, in the worship of reception that sealed the integration of these two communities, "Now we are great in number and solid in our structures." He said that the IPA, the name that drives will work with two other Presbyterian churches that until very recently acted in isolation. And invited them to follow suit, to create a Presbyterian community increasingly united. Also according to the pastor Rondinho Antonio Bento, the IPA's doors are open to welcome in its midst all those who understand the need for unity, where efforts lead all members to better serve the Lord in the church."

== Seminary ==
The Presbyterian Church in Angola with the partnership with the Transcultural Presbyterian Mission Agency of the Presbyterian Church of Brazil built a Seminary building in the end of 2012 in Luanda, Angola. This building sits in a 660 m high area.

Previously in 2012 there were 4 Angolan Presbyterian seminarians, who studied in Brazilian theological seminaries, 2 in Northern Presbyterian Seminary in Recife, and the others are in the Presbyterian Theological seminary in Belo Horizonte.

The Presbyterian Theological Institution was opened by Pastor Neves Massaqui.
