= Negage =

- Municipality and town
- Location in Angola
- Coordinates: 07°46′S 015°16′E
- Country: Angola
- Province: Uíge Province

Population (2024 Census)
  - Total: 188,767
- Time zone: UTC+1 (WAT)

Negage is a town and municipality (município) of the Uíge province in Angola. The municipality had a population of 188,767 in 2024. It is served by Negage Airport.

The city is crossed by the Cauã River. The soil is arable and the area is noted for coffee production. It has a mission of Capuchin priests, a church dating from the 1970s, and two soccer fields located in the neighborhood of Capopa. It has a hospital and clinic space for more than 40 beds, and provided housing for clinicians, doctors and nurses within the hospital perimeter.
