= Evangelical Congregational Church in Angola =

Protestant church in Angola

- Portuguese: Igreja Evangélica Congregacional em Angola
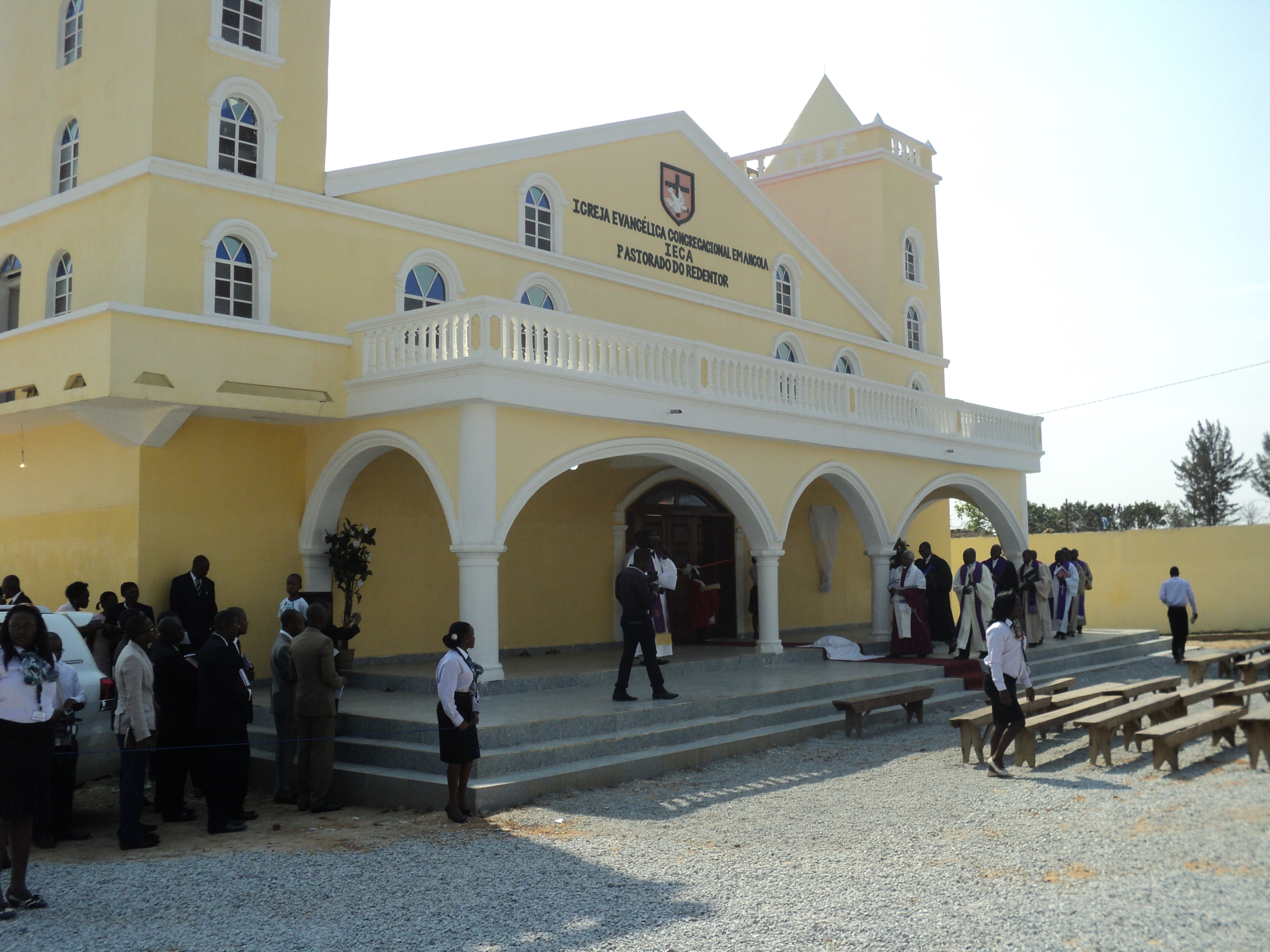
- Abbreviation: IECA
- Classification: Reformed Protestantism
- Headquarters: Huambo, Angola
- Founder: Missionaries associated with the United Church of Christ (USA) and the Congregational Church in Canada and their students
- Branched from: Council of Evangelical Churches in Angola
- Congregations: 2,800
- Members: 1,000,000+

The Evangelical Congregational Church in Angola (Portuguese: Igreja Evangélica Congregacional em Angola – IECA) is a Reformed Christian denomination in Angola.

== History ==
On November 11, 1880, the American Board of Commissioners for Foreign Missions (now the United Church of Christ in the USA) and the Congregational Church in Canada sent missionaries and began to evangelize in the highlands of Angola. The leaders of this mission were the Rev. William W. Bagster, the Rev. William Henry Sanders and the Rev. Samuel Taylor Miller (the first Black African missionary in Angola).

In 1940, a theological school was established to train pastors and ministers. This resulted in significant growth and development in the church. In 1957, the work of the North American Congregational Churches was united and the Council of Evangelical Churches in Angola was founded.

In 1975, after the country had gained independence, the Angolan Civil War broke out. The war devastated Angola's infrastructure and severely damaged the nation's public administration, economic enterprises and religious institutions. The war forced foreign missionaries to leave the country. The church was divided into two parts; rural and urban. During and after the war, the church remained divided into the Evangelical Congregational Church in Angola and the Evangelical Reformed Church in Angola.

== The Church Today ==
The headquarters of the church is in Huambo. The fast-growing denomination is present in 16 of the 18 Angolan provinces. It has 60 primary and secondary schools and a medical program. The Evangelical Congregational Church in Angola is the second oldest Protestant denomination in Angola. It trains ministers in the Interdenominational Seminary in Huambo. The church has approximately 1,000,000 members in 2,800 congregations across the country.

== Theology ==
- Apostles' Creed
- Heidelberg Catechism
- Nicene Creed

== Interchurch relations ==
Member of the World Communion of Reformed Churches and the World Council of Churches and partner church relationship with the United Church of Canada was established.
