= Mucaba =

- Municipality and town
- Location in Angola
- Coordinates: 7°10′S 14°56′E
- Country: Angola
- Province: Uíge Province

Population (2014 Census)
  - Total: 43,974
- Time zone: UTC+1 (WAT)

Mucaba is a town and municipality in Uíge Province in Angola. The municipality had a population of 43,974 in 2014.
