= Evangelical Reformed Church in Angola =

Protestant church in Angola

- Portuguese: Igreja Evangelica Reformada de Angola
- Classification: Reformed Protestantism
- Headquarters: Luanda, Angola
- Founder: Missionaries from the Swiss Reformed Church
- Origin: 1925; Kikaya, Uige Province, Angola
- Separated from: The Mission of Northern Angola
- Congregations: 450
- Members: 300,000+

The Evangelical Reformed Church in Angola is a Reformed denomination in the country of Angola established by the missionaries of the Swiss Reformed Church.

== History ==
The Evangelical Reformed Church in Angola was established in 1925 in Kikaya, Uige Province in the north by Swiss and English missionaries, especially Archibald Patterson from Liverpool and Ernest Nickleus of the Swiss Reformed Church. The Mission of Northern Angola covered the Northern part of Angola, included the cities of Kikuya, Kinkuni, and Kimbela. During the Portuguese rule, catechists and evangelist were often arrested. During the Angolan Civil War, the church suffered persecution, and properties were destroyed. Later the mission was divided into 3 parts, one part fled to Zaire during the war, the other in the woods to the guerillas, the third remained the towns and cities. After the war, parishes were reconstructed. The church reopened in 1973. Headquarters were removed from Uige to Luanda. It is primarily strong in the Eastern part of the country though it is present in 11 provinces out of the 18 in Angola. In 1978 adopted the current name.

The Presbyterian Church of Angola separated from the denomination in 1986 under the leadership of Neves Massaqui.

== Doctrine ==
The church affirms the historic confessions of:

- Heidelberg Catechism
- Second Helvetic Confession
- Apostles Creed.

Member of the World Communion of Reformed Churches.

== Statistics ==
The church has 300,000 members in 450 congregations served by 370 pastors.
