= Luremo =

- commune
- Location in Angola
- Coordinates: 8°30′57″S 17°49′45″E
- Country: Angola
- Province: Lunda Norte

Area
  - Total: 4,404 km^{2} (1,700 sq mi)

Population (2014)
  - Total: 22,587
- Time zone: UTC+1 (WAT)

Luremo is a town and commune of Angola. It is located in the northwest of the province of Lunda Norte along the eastern segment of Estrada Nacional nº 225 north of the town of Cafunfo. To the north, it shares a border with Kwango Province of the Democratic Republic of the Congo.

== History ==
Luremo is located in an area that was part of the Kingdom of Lunda prior to the Portuguese colonization of the region.

The settlement itself can be traced back to 1899, when it was a Portuguese military fort and mission in the then-province of Lunda. In 1900, the first missionaries sent by the Portuguese government arrived in the village of Musuku and built a chapel and missionary residence, and then five years later, opened a boarding school for boys. Other chapels and missionary residences were built afterwards. Lunda was split into Lunda Norte and Lunda Sul by the revolutionary government in 1978. Luremo has since grown to a town with an estimated population of around 30,000 people living in the commune by 2023.

In 2003–2006, the Angolan government enacted Operation Brilliant, an action to combat illegal diamond mining and smuggling by rebel groups and undocumented Congolese miners, in which hundreds of thousands of people were deported to the DRC. These people were driven to Luremo in cramped military trucks, searched, often in invasive and degrading ways, and then forced to walk, without access to food, water, or sanitation, the last 65 kilometers to the Congolese border.

In April 2024, the Mission of the Sacred Heart of Jesus of Musuku was one of six sites proposed by the Provincial Government of Lunda-Norte to the Ministry of Culture, Tourism and the Environment to be declared a National Heritage.

== Economy ==
=== Diamond mining ===
Luremo contains rich alluvial deposits of diamonds and is highly reliant on formal and informal diamond mining for its economy, with mines such as the Sociedade Mineira da Luminas mine employing hundreds of people. These mines have received allegations of human rights abuses perpetrated both by police and by private security companies such as K&P Mineira, with reports of detainment without cause, confiscation of property for ransom, harsh and unhygienic working conditions, beatings, torture, murder, and rape.

=== Agriculture ===
Luremo also has fertile land and an agricultural sector, which produces a wide variety of foods, including vegetables such as beans, corn, cassava, and sweet potato, however farming is done by hand rather than in a modern, mechanized fashion due to lack of tools, and much of this capacity is currently devoted to subsistence agriculture. In 2023, interim administrator José Muheto told Jornal de Angola his belief that Luremo could provide food for nearby communities such as Cuango, Xá-Muteba and Capenda-Camulemba if this agricultural sector could be better supported.

=== Infrastructure and trade ===
There is a lack of economic diversification and commercial activity in town. Exacerbated by a lack of infrastructure, this often forces residents to travel 35 kilometers down EN-225, a dirt road, to Cafunfo to obtain goods and supplies. In January 2022, the failure of an improvised bridge making up part of EN-225 left Luremo and Cafunfo cut off together from the rest of Angola amidst calls for the government to provide more and better road infrastructure.

The Kwango River flows through the west side of Luremo, which also shares a border with the Democratic Republic of the Congo. Muheto stated hopes that it can be utilized to facilitate cross-border trade with communities in the DRC, though no border or river markets yet exist as of 2023.

Luremo is serviced by an airstrip. In 1996, an Antonov An-32B belonging to Ukraine Air Alliance overran the runway while talking off, causing damage that caused it to be written off but with no casualties.

=== Services ===
==== Healthcare ====
Healthcare in Luremo is provided by two facilities, the Health Centre and the Maternal and Child Health Centre, which combined have a staff of just three nurses.

==== Education ====
The Luremo commune has seven educational facilities, one of which is in each of the localities of Luremo, Calumbo, Mussuco, Curva, Mahango, Pedro Bumba and N'gulia Kama. In 2023, there were as few as only ten teachers in the network, which goes up to ninth grade.

==== Power and water ====
Power is currently powered by a generator supplied by the Sociedade Mineira da Luminas. Luremo is among the towns designated by the Minister of Energy and Water, João Baptista Borges, to host one of fifteen planned solar parks as part of the Rural Electrification initiative in Lunda Norte, which aims to generate 256 megawatts of solar power across the province by 2027.

A public drinking water system is still under construction.

==== Other ====
There is no bank in Luremo as of 2023.

== Demographics ==
=== Religion ===
The vast majority of the population are Christian, with over half the population (52.9%) reporting as Protestant in 2014 and 31.8% as Catholic. 14% reported affiliation with no religion.

=== Education ===
In the 2014 census, only half the adult population of Luremo was literate.

== See also ==
- Communes of Angola
- Mining industry of Angola
