= Camissombo =

- commune
- Location in Angola
- Coordinates: 8°09′23″S 20°39′23″E
- Country: Angola
- Province: Lunda Norte

Area
  - Total: 3,500 km^{2} (1,400 sq mi)

Population (2014)
  - Total: 15,302
  - Density: 4.4/km^{2} (11/sq mi)
- Time zone: UTC+1 (WAT)

Camissombo is a town and commune of Angola, located in the Lucapa municipality in the province of Lunda Norte.

== Economy ==
=== Diamond mining ===
Since 2023, Camissombo has been producing diamonds out of the 508 square kilometer Sociedade Mineira Yetwene (SMY) mine in the Chicapa River basin. SMY is a partnership between ENDIAMA, Mountain Stability, the Sociedade Mineira de Investimentos da Lunda, and All Magic, Lda.

In 2024, Vánia Ferreira, the person in charge of planning and operating SMY, announced a planned expansion of the mining operation that is expected to more than quadruple its ore treatment capacity and increase monthly diamond production from three thousand to thirteen thousand carats. According to Ferreira, the mine employs 224 people, and is expected to increase that number by 45% once the expansion is complete.

=== Infrastructure and services ===
Estrada Nacional nº 180, a dirt highway, runs north-south through Camissombo, connecting it in the north to EN-190 and EN-223 at Dundo and in the south to Lucapa and Saurimo.

Camissombo is one of 15 locations selected by Minister of Energy and Water João Baptista Borges to host a new solar park as part of the Lunda Norte Rural Electrification initiative by the project's planned completion in 2027. When the project is complete, the new solar parks are expected to generate 256 megawatts of solar energy for the communities they serve.

The Escola do Camissombo has spaces for 120 students, and was recently renovated as part of the obligations of SMY. SMY has also partnered with the University of Luanda to provide arts education in Camissombo and internships to UniLuanda students.

== Demographics ==
=== Religion ===
Religious affiliation (2014)
| Protestant | 61.4% |
| Catholic | 12.3% |
| Indigenous religions | 6.2% |
| Muslim | 3.4% |
| Jewish | 0.6% |
| Other religion | 3.3% |
| Unaffiliated | 12.8% |
All figures from 2014 census

Camissombo has a mostly Christian population, with the majority of the population identifying as Protestant or Catholic in 2024. 942 people identified as practicing an indigenous religion, making them, viewed together, the second largest religious group after Christianity.

=== Age ===
Population by age group
All figures according to 2014 census

== See also ==
- Communes of Angola
- Mining industry of Angola
