= Teleservice =

Private security company in Angola

Teleservice Sociedade de Segurança e Serviços Lda
- Type: Private
- Industry: Private security
- Founded: December 13, 1993; 32 years ago
- Headquarters: Av 4 de Fevereiro, n° 208, 1st floor, Luanda, Angola
- Key people: José Figueiredo (President)
- Services: Bodyguards; Cash-in-transit; Demining; Maritime patrol; Motoristas; Security guards; Security alarms; Risk management; Telecommunications
- Number of employees: More than 5,000 (2024)
- Website: teleservice.co.ao

Teleservice Sociedade de Segurança e Serviços Lda, is the largest private security company in Angola. It counts many international oil companies among its clients including the state-owned Sonangol group.

== History ==
Teleservice was founded in 1993 as a private military company charged with protecting the Angolan mining and oil sectors during the Angolan Civil War. It was a partnership between several former Angolan military leaders; Joaquim Duarte da Costa David, former director of Sonangol; and Gray Security Services Ltd, a South African security firm with connections to the mercenary company Executive Outcomes, which operated in Angola until December 31, 1998, when South African citizens were banned from participating in foreign conflicts. The officers involved included:

- General António dos Santos França, who was then President of DeBeers Angola (10% stake)
- General João de Matos, former Chief of General Staff of the Angolan Armed Forces (FAA) (10% stake)
- General Luís Pereira Faceira, former Chief of General Staff of the People's Armed Forces for the Liberation of Angola (FAPLA) (9% stake)
- General António Emilio Faceira, commander of the Special Forces Commando Battalion, formerly of FAPLA then of FAA (8% stake)
- General Armando da Cruz Neto, then Governor of Benguela and former Chief of General Staff of the FAA (7%)
- General Paulo Pfluger Barreto Lara, then Inspector-General of the General Staff of the FAA (6%)
- General Adriano Makevela Mackenzie, head of military training at the joint chiefs of staff of the FAA
- General Carlos Alberto Hendrick Vaal da Silva, then Inspector-General of the General Staff of the FAA
- General Manuel Hélder Vieira Dias, then Minister of State and head of the Intelligence Bureau at the Presidency

In 1995, the Divisão Marítima da TELESERVICE was created to perform security operations in rivers and offshore.

In 2002, Teleservice transitioned from a PMC to a civilian security company with a pivot away from armed security services.

As of October 2024, Teleservice employs more than 5,000 Angolans.

=== Crimes against humanity, exposure, and coverup ===
In 2011, Angolan journalist and anti-corruption activist Rafael Marques published Diamantes de Sangue: Corrupção e Tortura em Angola (Blood Diamonds: Corruption and Torture in Angola), an exposé alleging severe human rights violations by personnel of Teleservice, the FAA, and other private security companies protecting the operations of the diamond mining companies in the provinces of Lunda Norte and Lunda Sul. The exposé included more than five hundred reports of massacres, murders, rapes, mutilations, extortion, corpse desecration, organ removal, beatings, torture, slavery, and similar abuses. França, de Matos, Luís Faceira, António Faceira, Neto, Lara, Mackenzie, da Silva, and Dias were all named both in the report and in a criminal complaint then filed by Marques. In December of that year, over 18,000 people in the region, including 3,000 in the town of Cafunfo, took place in political demonstrations demanding the withdrawal of Teleservice. Teleservice withdrew in March 2012.

The generals named in the report tried to press charges in 2013 in Portugal, where Diamantes de Sangue was published by Tinta da China, for defamation. The attorney general there dismissed the charges, as he felt the report was well-researched and credible.

In 2015, following Marques's receipt of an international journalism award, the generals pressed twenty-four charges of defamation against him in Angola, with a potential prison time of nine years and a fine in excess of $1,200,000. He was convicted of one, and given a six-month sentence deferred by two years, however Angolan authorities including Minister of the Interior Ângelo de Veiga Barros and Head of State Intelligence and Security Services Eduardo Filomeno Barber Leiro Octavio did recognize the existence of the human rights violations and material damages included in Marques's report. After an open statement by over 30 jewelers and press freedom and human rights NGOs in support of Marques, the charges against him were dropped under the provision that Diamantes de Sangue was not to be reprinted.

== Services ==
Teleservice offers a variety of security-related services, including providing security for oil rigs and other offshore facilities, industrial security, property security, cash-in-transit services, VIP and personal security escorts, and security risk assessment and management services.

== Clients ==
Teleservice is or has been employed by the following clients:

- Sonangol Group
- Chevron-Texaco
- Esso
- Halliburton
- Norsk Hydro
- Petromar International
- Sociedade Mineira do Cuango, which shared owners with Teleservice,
- TotalEnergies

== See also ==
- Blood diamond
- Corruption in Angola
