= Human rights in Angola =

Angola has long been severely criticized for its human rights record. A 2012 report by the U.S. Department of State said, "The three most important human rights abuses [in 2012] were official corruption and impunity; limits on the freedoms of assembly, association, speech, and press; and cruel and excessive punishment, including reported cases of torture and beatings as well as unlawful killings by police and other security personnel. Other human rights abuses included: harsh and potentially life-threatening prison conditions; arbitrary arrest and detention; lengthy pretrial detention; impunity for human rights abusers; lack of judicial process and judicial inefficiency; infringements on citizens' privacy rights and forced evictions without compensation; restrictions on nongovernmental organizations; discrimination and violence against women; abuse of children; trafficking in persons; discrimination against persons with disabilities, indigenous people, and persons with HIV/AIDS; limits on workers' rights; and forced labor." In 2022, Freedom House rated Angola "not free".

== Historical background ==
Formerly a Portuguese colony, Angola waged a war of independence that lasted from 1961 until 1975.

Following Angola gaining its independence in 1975, the country almost immediately plunged into a civil war between the governing Popular Movement for the Liberation of Angola (MPLA), which was supported by the Soviet Union and Cuba, and the National Union for the Total Independence of Angola (UNITA), supported by the United States and South Africa; the conflict is now considered to be one of the major proxy wars of the Cold War, Both the MPLA and UNITA utilised child soldiers. The war, which ended in 2002 with victory for the MPLA, resulted in a humanitarian crisis in the country; in 2003, 80 percent of Angolans had no access to basic medical care and 60 percent had no water. According to Freedom House, the Angolan civil war "claimed an estimated one million lives, displaced more than four million people, and forced over half a million to flee to neighboring countries. Many resettled people have remained without land, basic resources, or even identification documents. The resettlement process was slowed by the presence of an estimated 500,000 landmines and a war-ruined infrastructure. Legislative elections, delayed repeatedly since 1997, were finally held in September 2008."

Angola, officially a constitutional republic, has been run by the MPLA since 1975, with the office of president currently held by João Lourenço since 2017. An October 2010 article in The Guardian suggested that "[o]il, diamonds and landmines are just three clues to understanding the country – to which might be added poverty, repression and polio.... It is now one of Africa's biggest oil producers yet remains one of the world's poorest countries". Prior to Lourenço, Angola's president was José Eduardo dos Santos, who was in the role for 38 years between 1979 and 2017. Following the fall of Muammar Gaddafi in Libya in 2011, dos Santos became Africa's longest serving leader; he has since been surpassed by Teodro Obiang Nguema Mbasogo of Equatorial Guinea. In 2010, dos Santos introduced a new constitution that abolished direct presidential election and eliminated the post of prime minister, further strengthening his position. Although the new constitution contained strong language about the protection of freedom of expression, association, and assembly, Raul Danda of the opposition UNITA party called it "a complete fraud" and said his fellow party members were wearing black "because it's like going to the graveyard to bury democracy".

== Basic rights ==
While Angola's constitution and law prohibit discrimination based on race, gender, religion, disability, language, or social status, the government has not effectively enforced these prohibitions.

In 2012, Human Rights Watch reported that "although Angola's 2010 constitution guarantees the rights to freedom of expression, peaceful assembly, and freedom of the media, the government has increasingly limited the exercise of these rights." A 2011 report by the U.S. State Department noted that the Angolan government was believed to engage in illegal surveillance of journalists, government opponents, and others, that journalists in the country are arrested, harassed, and charged with defamation, and that some journalists have been victims of shooting, stabbing, vandalism, and burglary. This has resulted in many journalists exercising self-censorship, with businesses pressured to withdraw advertising of media critical against the government, with little in the way of independent media outside of Luanda.

The government, according to Human Rights Watch, "has approved restrictive legislation, dragged its feet in allowing privately owned and community radio stations to operate in Angola's interior, censored state-owned media, sought to control the existing privately owned media, and prosecuted and intimidated independent journalists and civic activists".

=== Police violence ===
In 2009, Angolan forces "arbitrarily killed 61 persons". The use of excessive force by police has routinely leads to deaths. In several cases in 2011 alone, Amnesty International reported that "off-duty police officers were accused of shooting and killing individuals", and most of the accused "had not been brought to justice by the end of the year". Human Rights Watch noted in 2012 that dos Santos had "faced an unprecedented wave of criticism" in 2011, with growing anti-government protests "[i]nspired by the pro-democracy Arab Spring movements", to which authorities had responded by using "excessive force" and by "curtail[ing] media coverage of the demonstrations".

=== Free speech and right of assembly ===
Human Rights Watch reported in July 2012 that Angola's government was "targeting protest organizers for arbitrary arrest and detention in response to increasing demonstrations criticizing the government or its policies". Angola had been the setting of "unprecedented public protests since 2011" by young people and war veterans, with the former demanding "social reforms and the resignation of President José Eduardo dos Santos" and the latter demanding "long overdue social benefits". The authorities had responded to the youth protests "with increasingly violent crackdowns, despite their small scale, and have arrested many youth leaders, journalists, and opposition leaders". One of the veterans' protests, which had "gained momentum since June", had been dispersed with teargas and gunfire, and over 50 veterans had been jailed, along with a leader of the a veterans' complaints commission. In September 2011, according to Amnesty International, the provincial government in Luanda "issued a by-law indicating the areas that could be used for assemblies and demonstrations. It excluded Independence Square, where the majority of anti-government demonstrations had taken place during the year."

In 2012, Human Rights Watch accused the Angolan government of "numerous incidents of political violence, intimidation of protesters, and crackdowns on peaceful demonstrations" in the run-up to the 2012 parliamentary elections. The report described a "crackdown on peaceful protests and the media" and "increasing incidents of political violence and intimidation". Incidents of political violence against “journalists, civil society activists, and others seeking to express their opinions or criticize the government of President José Eduardo dos Santos" had been on the rise, police and plainclothes security agents had "forcibly dispersed anti-government protests, beating and arresting peaceful demonstrators, organizers, and opposition politicians, and obstructing and intimidating journalists", and the government-run media had "sought to compel activists in custody to make incriminating remarks about opposition parties".

According to the International Telecommunication Union, approximately 15 percent of individuals in Angola used the Internet in 2011.

The right of assembly is guaranteed by Angola's constitution, although in reality demonstrations are frequently disrupted by police. Authorities must be informed in advance of public gatherings, but official permission is not necessary, although some gatherings have subsequently been prohibited by the government. Gatherings of the regime's critics are routinely disallowed or monitored heavily by police, with speakers at such events subject to punishment for remarks critical of the authorities. According to Human Rights Watch, there has been an increasing use in recent years of "unnecessary force against peaceful protesters and organizers".

=== Freedom of religion ===
Angola's constitution defines the country as secular, in which church and state are separated and guarantees freedom of conscience and religion. Religious groups must apply to the ministries of justice and culture for licenses; under the 2004 Law on Religion, such groups require at least 100,000 members, and adherents in at least 12 of Angola's 18 provinces to be recognized. Islam is not recognized, and the government has closed mosques as well as Islamic centers and schools. A total of 83 groups are officially recognized, while thousands of groups operate illegally. According to a 2012 U.S. State Department report on religious freedom, Angolan government agencies and civil society groups have enjoyed considerable success in their joint efforts to overcome native religious activities such as animal sacrifices, shamanism, and exorcism, which involve neglect and abuse.

=== Freedom of movement ===
Angola's constitution and law technically permit freedom of movement within the country, freedom to travel abroad, and freedom to move abroad and repatriate. However, domestic travel is complicated by checkpoints at which travelers are subject to harassment and extortion by authorities, with international travel is complicated by a “rigid system of entry and exit visas".

=== Corruption ===
Corruption is illegal but endemic in the Angolan government and businesses; it is rarely prosecuted. Extortion is widespread, as is bribery of government officials by businesses. The first postwar elections were held in 2008, and was considered generally fair, though the government's control of media gave it a strong advantage compared to the opposition. The president and his Council of Ministers have extensive powers, with the council, on the president's behalf, exercising both executive and legislative functions. Laws are usually drafted by the president and Council and submitted to the elected National Assembly for what is essentially a rubber-stamping. In November 2011, members of UNITA “walked out of a parliamentary debate on the new Electoral Legislative package for the 2012 general elections", complaining that it “contained unconstitutional provisions". In 2012, the Centre for Human Rights at the University of Pretoria expressed concern about human-rights abuses in Angola "particularly since David Mendes declared that his political party will run against the party of the incumbent President, Jose Eduardo dos Santos, in the upcoming national elections to be held sometime in 2012". Following Mendes's declaration of his candidacy, he reported receiving death threats and that his property and that of the human rights organization Mãos Livres and Partido Popular vandalized. The death threats have intensified after he filed a complaint to the Attorney Generals' Office against the incumbent president accusing him of embezzlement of public funds".

=== Property ownership ===
In Angola, property ownership has long been an ambiguous question, and the 2010 constitution resolved this question by declaring that all land belongs to the state. The government frequently makes use of its universal land ownership rights to seize and destroy private homes, sometimes several thousand at a time, without compensating owners fairly. In one such incident in 2010, seven individuals were killed, including a child. A 2012 Amnesty International report noted that such "forced evictions" were still taking place, "although on a smaller scale than previous years, and thousands of people remained at risk of being forcibly evicted". Thousands of previously evicted families have still not been compensated by the government. One of the 2011 eviction incidents involved 40 families in Luanda whose land was sold by the government to a private company. Houses and possessions were destroyed, and one resident was killed by police on the spot when he tried to halt the destruction. Evictions have continued to occur, with many families remaining homeless as a result.

=== Treatment of migrants ===
While expelling illegal migrants, police have been known to commit rapes and other acts of violence. After visiting Angola in March 2011, the Special Representative of the UN Secretary-General on Sexual Violence in Conflict expressed concern over the continued reports of sexual violence against Congolese migrants by Angolan armed forces during expulsions, although Angola's Minister of Foreign Affairs denied the charges. In December 2011, the Ministry of Foreign Affairs stated that the government would coordinate with the UN to expel foreign nationals from the country."

In May 2012, Human Rights Watch issued a report, titled "'If You Come Back We Will Kill You': Sexual Violence and Other Abuses against Congolese Migrants during Expulsions from Angola", in which it described "an alarming pattern of human rights violations by members of Angolan security forces against Congolese migrants. Women and girls, who are often detained with their children, have been victims of sexual abuse, including gang rape, sexual exploitation, and being forced to witness sexual abuse of other women and girls. Beatings, degrading and inhumane treatment, arbitrary arrests, and denial of due process have been common practices during roundups of undocumented migrants, and in custody before their deportation."

=== Health ===
Health in Angola is rated among the worst in the world, and only a large fraction of the population receives even rudimentary medical attention.

Many landmines remain active in Angola stemming from the civil war, resulting in 12 deaths in 2010, although demining programs are underway.

== Women's rights ==
According to Angola's constitution and laws, women enjoy equal rights with men, but societal discrimination is widespread, especially outside of cities, and an executive decree prohibits women from holding certain jobs.

Rape, including marital rape, can be punished by up to eight years in prison, but most cases are not prosecuted because of limited resources. Domestic violence has been described as "pervasive, particularly in urban areas"; not until June 2011 did the Angolan parliament pass a law criminalizing it. The great majority of women are subjected to some kind of violence before age 15. Sexual harassment is also widespread and is not illegal, but may be prosecuted as defamation or assault.

Women, as well as the elderly and children, are sometimes subjected to violence by persons accusing them of witchcraft. Such episodes can result in death. Police do not get involved because they fear that a spell will be cast against them. Hundreds have also been killed in violent religious rituals.

Contraception is legal in Angola.

== Disability rights ==
Discrimination against disabled persons is illegal, but this in practice is not well enforced. There is no law providing for wheelchair access to buildings or for other protections or services for disabled people. Among the disabled individuals in Angola are tens of thousands of persons injured by land mines.

Angola ratified both the Convention on the Rights of Persons with Disabilities and the Optional Protocol to the Convention on the Rights of Persons with Disabilities in May 2014.

== Indigenous peoples' rights ==
Traditional hunter-gatherers have little connection to Angolan society at large or the Angolan state, although provincial governments are involved in efforts to improve services and communication.

== LGBT rights ==
The U.S. Department of State's 2012 human rights report found,

The law criminalizes same-sex activity, although there were no reported cases [in 2012] of this law being enforced. A draft penal code to replace the existing code (which was adopted in 1886 and, with several amendments, was valid at year's end) was passed in 2011. The draft code, which is intermittently used by the justice system, recognizes the right to same-sex relationships. The constitution defines marriage as between a man and a woman. [Non-governmental organizations] ... reported a small underground lesbian, gay, bisexual, and transgender (LGBT) community in Luanda. There were isolated reports of same-sex couples being harassed by their communities. There were no NGOs advocating for the rights of the LGBT community.

In 2019, Angola decriminalised homosexuality.

== Human-rights groups ==
A number of human-rights groups operate in Angola, with some of them experiencing government interference and resistance. In 2008 the UNHRO closed its Angola office because the government, which had promised to work more closely with it, became less cooperative after winning a term on the UN Human Rights Council. In August 2011, according to Amnesty International, immigration authorities at Quatro de Fevereira Airport refused entry into Angola to delegates of various civil society organizations who were to attend the Civil Society Forum of the Southern African Development Community (SADC), despite arrangements having been made for them to receive visas upon arrival at the airport. Two Mozambican journalists who were to cover the Summit were also refused entry, despite having valid visas.

In 2012, the government allowed local nongovernmental organizations (NGO) to engage in human rights-related work. However, many NGOs were forced to limit their work due to problems registering, intimidation, and harassment and closure from government forces.

== HIV/AIDS rights ==
It is illegal to discriminate against persons with HIV/AIDS, but the prohibition is not enforced. According to one source, "people with HIV/AIDS face stigma on a daily basis." The source cites a 2003 study as saying that "[i]f a local shopkeeper were known to be HIV-positive, nearly half of all young people (and more than two-thirds of those with no education) said they would refuse to buy food from him. Similarly, more than one-third (and nearly two-thirds of those with no education) would refuse to share a meal with an HIV-positive person."

== Employees' rights ==
Workers may join unions. All non-government workers may strike, though there are strict rules governing this. The ruling party is traditionally tied to labor, and some unions are government-run. Collective bargaining is technically permitted but is subject in practice to restrictions. Forced labor is illegal, but occurs, with many men and boys being trafficked into Angola for forced labor in construction and other sectors. Children under 14 are not allowed to work, but many children work on family farms, as street vendors, and in homes. Some children are forced to work as prostitutes, in the drug transport or sales, and as international couriers. There are many street children who beg, perform such jobs as shoeshining and carwashing, commit small crimes, or are sexually exploited. There is a low minimum wage, with most people relying on multiple jobs to earn a living. Most workers are employed in agricultural jobs or other sectors in which there is little or no government control of working conditions. There are laws that regulate working conditions but they are not well enforced even in the formal sector. Workers' rights are routinely violated with impunity. The occupational health and safety standards are poorly enforced, as are rulings on labor violations.

== Rights of refugees and asylum seekers ==
Angola's law allows for granting asylum and refugee status, and a system is in place for protecting refugees.

== Rights of persons under arrest ==
Although Angolan law forbids arbitrary arrest, it occurs often. Warrants are technically required, but arrests are often made without them, and about 75 percent of searches take place without a warrant. Authorities have been known to detain family members of suspected criminals. The constitution requires that suspects be promptly brought to court to determine the legality of their detention, but this requirement is often violated. Authorities do generally conform to the requirement that suspects be informed of charges within five days of being taken into custody. There is an inefficient bail system for minor offences, with prison officials demanding bribes to release inmates. In 2009, over 500 people were being held illegally. In mining areas, security forces detain, rape, and abuse illegal immigrants and their families. Political opponents of the regime are also arbitrarily arrested. Defendants are technically allowed to have lawyers, and indigent defendants are entitled to government-paid representation, but this right is often ignored. Suspects are often subjected to very long periods of pretrial detention. Instead of being put on trial, many suspects are beaten and then released. Others are detained past the legal time limit.

== Rights of persons on trial ==
The judiciary has been described as "understaffed, inefficient, corrupt, and subject to executive and political influence". Supreme Court justices are appointed by the president and serve for life. Many local conflicts in the provinces are settled in informal courts that are run according to traditional tribal rules under which participants have few rights. In some areas, there are no prosecutors or magistrates, so local police serve multiple duties, carrying out investigations, prosecuting cases, and acting as judges. Although defendants are legally entitled to a fair trial, they do not always receive one. There are no juries within the Angolan court system. Defendants have no right to confront accusers, but under the law have the right to question witnesses for the prosecution and to present their own witnesses, although this right is not always respected. Nor is there the right to appeal.

== Rights of prisoners ==
Prison conditions in Angola have been described as "life threatening", with guards regularly beating and torturing inmates. Among the problems are overcrowding, inadequate food, water, medical care, and sanitation, which have led to deaths. At least one prison lacks electricity. Guards steal routinely from inmates, demand bribes for weekend passes and food delivery from their families, and rape female inmates. A variety of serious ailments, including malaria, are common and go untreated. In the provinces, juveniles guilty of minor infractions are often imprisoned alongside adults and abused by both fellow inmates and guards. Prisoners have freedom of worship, and prison conditions are monitored by authorities and by human-rights organizations. There is an ombudsman that takes up some human-rights matters.

During the 2020-21 COVID-19 pandemic, concerns were raised by the Interior Minister Eugénio César Laborinho around Angolan prisons' capacity to successfully quarantine new prisoners. Despite this, the police continued to detain inmates throughout the pandemic, often for low-level crimes; in May 2020 police figures indicated that in the previous 24 hours, 295 people had been detained for breaching lockdown restrictions.

== See also ==
- Freedom of religion in Angola
- Human trafficking in Angola
- Internet censorship and surveillance in Angola
- LGBT rights in Angola
- Politics of Angola
- Constitution of Angola

== Notes ==
1.Note that the "Year" signifies the "Year covered". Therefore the information for the year marked 2008 is from the report published in 2009, and so on.
2.11 November (Independence Day) in 1975; 1 January thereafter.
3.The 1982 report covers the year 1981, and the first half of 1982, and the following 1984 report covers the second half of 1982 and the whole of 1983. In the interest of simplicity, these two aberrant "year and a half" reports have been split into three year-long reports through interpolation.
