= Cassanguidi =

- Municipality and town
- Location in Angola
- Coordinates: 07°29′S 21°18′E
- Country: Angola
- Province: Lunda Norte Province
- Time zone: UTC+1 (WAT)

Cassanguidi (or Cassanguide) is a town in the municipality of Cambulo in Lunda Norte province of Angola.

== History ==
Cassanguidi developed out of the exploitation of diamond resources in Portuguese Angola in the early 20th century, as did Dundo and Nzagi, with mining operations being carried out by Diamang. Buildings and homes built by the company remain in the town. The Cassanguidi mine still exists, though mining is not constant. In 2021, ENDIAMA, the state-run diamond company, reported that the mine's reserves were being reassessed before mining might recommence.

A new school with 12 classrooms opened in the town in 2022.
