= Maludi =

- Municipality and town
- Location in Angola
- Coordinates: 08.019816°S 21.28828°E
- Country: Angola
- Province: Lunda Norte Province
- Time zone: UTC+1 (WAT)

Maludi is a town in the municipality of Cambulo in Lunda Norte province of Angola.

== History ==
Maludi developed out of the exploitation of diamond resources in Portuguese Angola, as did Dundo and Nzagi, and was a Diamang company town.
