= Nzagi (Andrada) =

- Municipality and town
- Location in Angola
- Coordinates: 07°41′20″S 21°21′43″E
- Country: Angola
- Province: Lunda Norte Province

Population (2014)
  - Total: 60,000
- Time zone: UTC+1 (WAT)

Nzagi (or N'Zagi) (formerly Andrada) is a town, with a population of 60,000 (2014), of the municipality of Cambulo in Lunda Norte Province in Angola. It was previously known by the name Andrada, and Vila Paiva de Andrada in full.

It is served by Nzagi Airport, a small airport located 3 kilometers southwards.

The diamond industry is the primary commercial concern of the area.

== History ==
Nzagi developed out of the exploitation of diamond resources in Portuguese Angola. In the early 20th century, mining prospectors discovered a significant diamond field in the area. General Paiva de Andrada was among those leading in this pursuit. In 1917, the Diamang company was founded, funded by foreign investors including from Portugal, Belgium, France, and the United States. Diamang set up its headquarters in Dundo in 1920, and later created mining centers in Cassanguidi, Vila Paiva de Andrada, and Maludi. Dundo and Vila Paiva de Andrada became the largest communities in northern Angola, though each had no "more than a hundred buildings," with mainly Diamang employees making up their populations. In 1931, both settlements were removed from the map of settlements, as they became Diamang's private towns. "Vila Paiva de Andrada", considered established in 1928, was named after General Paiva de Andrada.

Civil war broke out in Angola when it gained independence in 1975. Independence also caused the nationalization of the country's diamond assets. The forces of UNITA seized the town in 1986, kidnapping some Diamang employees. Diamang pulled out of the area that same year. With Diamang's effectively private-government control of the region absent after almost 70 years, the rebel forces controlled the area and used the diamond trade to support itself. By 1997-98, Angolan government forces had taken over occupation of Nzagi/Andrada.
