= Nzagi Airport =

Airport in Angola

- IATA: NZA; ICAO: FNZG

Summary
- Airport type: Public
- Operator: Government
- Serves: Nzagi (Andrada), Angola
- Elevation AMSL: 2,431 ft / 741 m
- Coordinates: 7°43′00″S 21°21′25″E

Map
- Location of Nzagi Airport in Angola

Runways
Direction	Length		Surface
Direction	m	ft	Surface
08/26	2,310	7,579	Dirt
- Source: WAD OurAirports Google Maps

Nzagi Airport (IATA: NZA, ICAO: FNZG) is an airport serving Nzagi (Andrada) in the Lunda Norte Province, in northeastern Angola.

== See also ==
- List of airports in Angola
- Transport in Angola
