= Cambulo =

- Municipality & Town
- Location in Angola
- Coordinates: 7°43′19″S 21°15′53″E
- Country: Angola
- Province: Lunda Norte

Government
  - Mayor: Francisco Munana

Area
  - Total: 41,607 km^{2} (16,065 sq mi)

Population (2014 Census)
  - Total: 120,127
  - Density: 2.8872/km^{2} (7.4778/sq mi)
- Time zone: UTC+1 (WAT)

Cambulo is a municipality in northeast Angola. The municipality had a population of 120,127 in 2014.

== Administration ==
The town of Nzagi is the seat of a municipality in Lunda Norte Province. The district covers an area of 41.607 km^{2} and has approximately 135,072 inhabitants (as of 2014).

The municipality of Cambulo consists of four communes:

- Cachimo
- Cambulo
- Canzar
- Luia

=== Sister cities ===
- Portugal Murça, Portugal
