= Cuango-Luzamba Airport =

Airport in Angola

Cuango-Luzamba Airport Aeroporto de Cuango-Luzamba
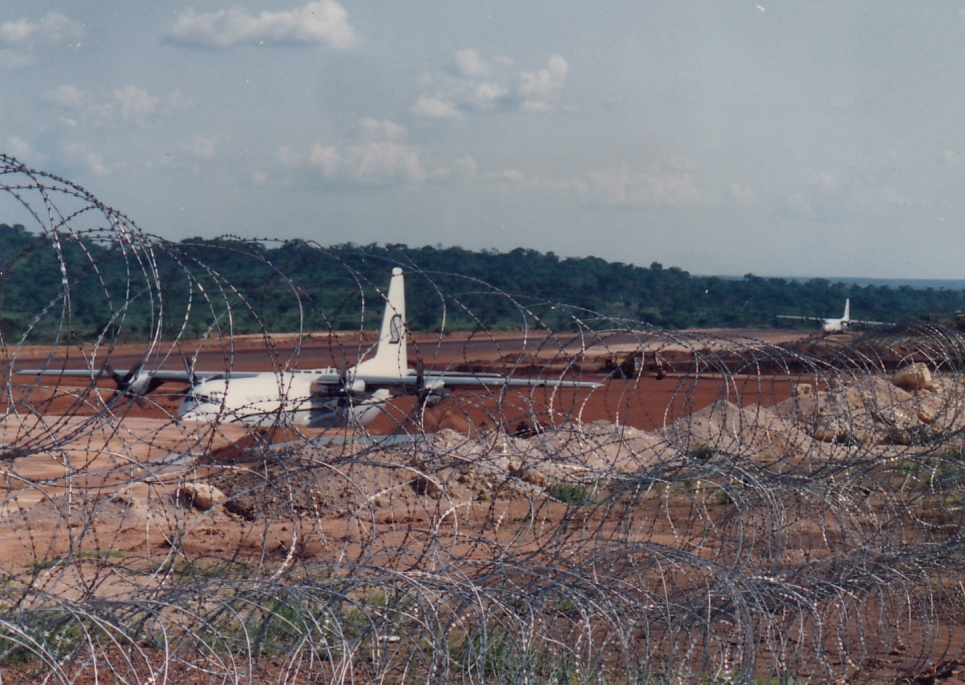
- Luzamba Airport in 1982
- IATA: LZM; ICAO: FNLZ

Summary
- Airport type: Public
- Owner/Operator: Government
- Serves: Cuango-Luzamba
- Elevation AMSL: 2,904 ft / 885 m
- Coordinates: 9°06′55″S 18°03′00″E

Map
- Location of airport in Angola

Runways
Direction	Length		Surface
Direction	m	ft	Surface
03/21	1,595	5,233	Gravel
- Source: WAD GCM STV Landings.com Google Maps

Cuango-Luzamba Airport (Portuguese: Aeroporto de Cuango-Luzamba (IATA: LZM, ICAO: FNLZ)) is an airport serving Cuango-Luzamba, in the Lunda Norte Province of Angola. The airport is known for its unrecovered wrecks.

== See also ==
- List of airports in Angola
- Transport in Angola
