= 1920s in Angola =

Angola-related events during the 1920s

In the 1920s in Angola mining became the primary source of revenue for the colonial government.

== Economy ==
Comphania de Diamantes de Angola, the Diamang diamond company of Angola, was established in 1920. The government maintained a 5% stake in the company, gave it a thirty-year lease to mine diamonds, and allowed it to operate without paying taxes or import tariffs. The company employed 10,000 workers and attracted investment from South Africa. In 1922, the Anglo American diamond company purchased a 16% stake in Diamang. The London Diamond Syndicate agreed to buy 125,000 carats (25.0 kg) from Angola annually. Under the rule of Governor General Norton de Matos, the colonial government spent 13 million pounds to bring 9,000 immigrants from Portugal, expanding construction of Benguela railway and roads. The settler population reached 36,000 by 1924. By 1929, mined resources made up 25% of Angola's exports, 600,000 pound sterling.

== Colonial governors ==
1. Mimoso Guerra, Governor-General of Angola (1919–1920)
2. Visconde de Pedralva, Governor-General of Angola (1920–1921)
3. João Mendes Ribeiro Norton de Matos, High Commissioner of Angola (1921–1924)
4. João Augusto Crispiniano Soares, High Commissioner of Angola (1924)
5. Antero Tavares de Carvalho, High Commissioner of Angola (1924–1925)
6. Francisco Cunha Rêgo Cháves, High Commissioner of Angola (1925–1926)
7. António Vicente Ferreira, High Commissioner of Angola (1926–1928)
8. António Damas Mora, High Commissioner of Angola (1928–1929)
9. Filomeno da Câmara Melo Cabral, High Commissioner of Angola (1929–1930)

== See also ==
- Portuguese West Africa
