= Mining industry of Angola =

Overview of the mining industry in Angola

Mining in Angola is an activity with great economic potential since the country has one of the largest and most diversified mining resources of Africa. Angola is the third largest producer of diamonds in Africa and has only explored 40% of the diamond-rich territory within the country, but has had difficulty in attracting foreign investment because of corruption, human rights violations, and diamond smuggling. Production rose by 30% in 2006 and Endiama, the national diamond company of Angola, expects production to increase by 8% in 2007 to 10,000,000 carats (2,000 kg) annually. The government is trying to attract foreign companies to the provinces of Bié, Malanje and Uíge. Angola has also historically been a major producer of iron ore.

== Angola's history in brief ==
The Portuguese arrived 1475 at the coast of what today is Angola. Until the 19th century, they practically remained confined to the bridgeheads of Luanda, Benguela and Moçâmedes and their hinterland. They used these vantage points in order to play a pivotal role in the Atlantic slave trade: until 1830 well over a million Angolan people were exported as slaves, mainly to Brazil, but also to the Caribbean and North America. They obtained slaves through raiding, but mostly by buying them from key figures in the African kingdoms east of Luanda. Territorial conquests were hesitantly attempted during the 19th century, but the occupation of what then became Angola was not achieved until the 1920s. Under Portuguese colonial rule in Angola, cities, towns and villages were founded, railroads were opened, ports built, and a Westernized society was being gradually developed. Since the 1920s, Portugal's administration has showed an increasing interest in developing the country's economy and social infrastructure.

In 1956 the People's Movement for the Liberation of Angola (MPLA) began to fight Portuguese rule and the forced labor camps where the Portuguese were confining many Africans. Many of them were relocated from their homes. In 1974 the Carnation Revolution in Portugal caused the Estado Novo regime to collapse, and Angola become independent from Portugal in 1975.

Jonas Savimbi’s UNITA movement began fighting his political rivals soon after independence and gained the support of the United States and South Africa because of his rivals' ties to communism and Cuba. The MPLA leader Agostinho Neto declared himself president of the country with the backing of Cuba and founded a Marxist–Leninist inspired regime. After Neto died in 1979, José Eduardo dos Santos became his successor. Unrest and civil war ensued for the next 27 years between UNITA and the MPLA. But in the early 1990s UNITA lost the support of both the United States and South Africa because of UNITA's refusal to accept a settlement that implied their peaceful integration in the multi-party system introduced by the MPLA in 1991. Cuba also pulled out of the civil war leaving the MPLA and Unita to fight each other without the support of world powers.

During the war the diamond mines were constantly being fought over, making it unsafe for miners to work, and usually after the mine was re-taken by the other side there would be land mines planted everywhere. This made it difficult to extract the diamonds but did not prevent either the MPLA or UNITA from using the diamonds to help fund the war. The vast amount of diamonds and oil to be mined could have funded the civil war for another 27 years, but UNITA leader Savimbi was killed by MPLA soldiers in 2002. This led to an almost-immediate ceasefire.

== Diamonds ==
Although there are some reports of diamond exports from Angola by the Portuguese as early as the eighteenth century, modern industrial diamond mining as we know it today began in 1912, when gems were discovered in a stream in Lunda region in the northeast. In 1917 Diamang was granted the concession for diamond mining and prospecting, which it held until independence. The government obtained control of the company in 1977. A general law on mining activities (Law 5/79) enacted in April 1979 gave the state the exclusive right to prospect for and exploit minerals. Accordingly, a state diamond-mining enterprise, the National Diamond Company (Emprêsa Nacional de Diamantes--Endiama), was founded in 1981 and acquired the government's 77 percent share in Diamand. UNITA selected the diamond mining industry as a principal target, and soon crippled mining efforts. The two foreign companies involved in servicing and operating the industry pulled out of Angola by 1986 and mid-1986 Diamang was formally dissolved, leaving large outstanding debts.

Attacks by UNITA on mining centers, disruption of transport routes, and widespread theft and smuggling caused diamond sales to fall to US$33 million by 1985 and to an estimated US$15 million in 1986.

In late 1986, Roan Selection Trust (RST) International, a subsidiary of the Luxembourg-registered holding company ITM International, began mining in the Cafunfo area, along the Cuango River, the site of Angola's most valuable alluvial diamond deposits (see fig. 9). Mining had been halted there for more than two years after UNITA attacked the mining camp in February 1984, kidnapping seventy-seven expatriate workers and severely damaging the mining equipment. After the subsequent kidnapping of a British expatriate in November 1986, defense forces in the area were strengthened, allowing the resumption of mining operations. In 1987 production there averaged 60,000 carats (12 kg), and about 120,000 carats (24 kg) were produced in the other two mining areas, Andrada and Lucapa. By 1987 diamond production had risen to 750,000 carats (150 kg), compared with less than 400,000 carats (80 kg) produced in 1986. The 1987 figure, however, was still not much more than 1985 production and only a little over half of 1980 output (see table 9, Appendix A).

This increase in production has benefited from the rise in the price per carat received for Angolan diamonds. The resumption of mining in the area along the Cuango River and fewer thefts of higher-value stones in the Andrada and Lucapa areas have increased output (measured by value). Furthermore, Endiama, which oversees the industry and holds monthly sales, has benefited from overall improvement in the world diamond market as well as dealers' willingness to pay higher prices in the hope of securing favored treatment in the future. As a result, average carat value established by the monthly sales in 1987 exceeded US$110, more than twice as much as in 1985 (US$45) and at its highest level since 1981 (US$119).

In 1987 Endiama signed a two-year mining contract with the Portuguese Enterprises Corporation (Sociedade Portuguesa de Empreendimentos (SPE), a Portuguese company that hired many Portuguese technicians previously employed by Diamang. Former Diamang shareholders founded SPE in 1979 after Diamang's nationalization. The precise terms of the contract were not made public, but it was thought that the company would undertake new prospecting, which had been at a virtual standstill since independence. Through a subsidiary, the SPE also was to help Endiama with diamond valuation, which a British company had previously been carrying out. In December 1987, Angola also signed an agreement with the Soviet Union to cooperate in mining diamonds and quartz. Under the terms of the agreement, the Soviet Union was to participate in mining enterprises and was to draw up a detailed geological map of Angola.

In 1987 the government also began to revise the 1979 mining law to encourage new companies to invest in the diamond-mining industry, and to resume prospecting in particular. Among the companies believed to be considering investing in 1988 was Britain's Lonrho conglomerate, which had taken an increasingly active interest in Angola in the late 1980s. The South African diamond-mining giant DeBeers also took an interest after it lost its exclusive marketing rights for Angolan diamonds at the end of 1985 because of government suspicions that DeBeers had low-balled the valuation of Angolan diamonds. DeBeers expressed interest in studying the kimberlite pipes, deep subsurface deposits which, because of the depletion of the alluvial deposits, were thought to represent the future of the Angolan diamond industry.

Angola is the third-largest producer of diamonds in Africa and has still only explored 40% of the diamond-rich territory within the country, but has had difficulty in attracting foreign investment because of corruption, human rights violations, and diamond smuggling. Production rose by 30% in 2006 and Endiama, the national diamond company of Angola, expects production to increase by 8% in 2007 to 10,000,000 carats (2,000 kg) annually. The government is trying to attract foreign companies to the provinces of Bié, Malanje and Uíge.

The Angolan government loses $375 million annually from diamond smuggling. In 2003 the government began Operation Brilliant, an anti-smuggling investigation that arrested and deported 250,000 smugglers between 2003 and 2006. Rafael Marques, a journalist and human rights activist, described the diamond industry in his 2006 Angola's Deadly Diamonds report as plagued by "murders, beatings, arbitrary detentions and other human rights violations." Marques called on foreign countries to boycott Angola's "conflict diamonds."

== Environmental impacts of diamond mining ==
In Angola, diamonds are the second leading export for the country behind oil. But their extraction causes harm to plants, water, and soil. Of the two primary methods of diamond extraction (kimberlite pipe mining and alluvial mining), pipe mining has more impact. Large sections of rock are removed by heavy machinery and hauled away to screening plants where they are searched for diamonds. For the machines and trucks to navigate, roads must be built, segregating the land. Catoca diamond mine (9.402323°S 20.3005028°E) did take issues of environmental impact into consideration when building. It is said that this particular mine holds about 60,000,000 carats (12,000 kg) worth of reserves. Other mines, however, were not designed to reduce environmental impacts. Aside from removing of massive amounts of land for mining purposed, the practice also leaches the soil of nutrients when diamond extraction takes place.

Pipe mining affects the local flora through road-building; forests are disrupted when machinery uproots trees to make roadways to the mines. It is estimated that about one ton of earth must be removed in order to produce less than 1 carat (0.20 g), and that soon the Catoca diamond mine will produce up to 5,000,000 carats (1,000 kg) annually, which will translate to almost 10,000,000,000 lb (4.5×10^{9} kg) of earth removed each year. Once land is disrupted in this way, it is very difficult for vegetation to re-grow.

Water quality is negatively affected by alluvial mining. Many rivers are diverted so that mines can be exposed; canals are created and short sections of the river are dammed. Although rivers can be returned to their natural state after mining, they are typically abandoned and left in the same condition they were in when they were in production. Soil deposits affect water quality as the land is unearthed. The water becomes clouded by sediment, polluting drinking water for animals. Oil and chemicals from the pipe mines seep into the ground and into the water supply.

In places where water is already scarce, it is important to keep the water they do have in good drinkable condition.

== Mining policies ==
Many environmental policies have been enacted over the past two decades due to the threat that mining poses to ecosystems and biodiversity in many regions in the world. Angola is located in one of the five most threatened hotspots in the world. The Congolean forest that is being endangered due to poor mining practices Agenda 21: 1992 Earth Summit asked transnational companies to reduce environmental damage and developed countries to begin sustainable consumption. Convention on Biological Diversity: Articles that were created to prevent and respond to activities and impacts that threaten biodiversity. Intergovernmental Panel on Forests: National forest program that addresses industrial development, agriculture, and energy to avoid bad policy choices that could affect forests negatively such as mining. Berlin Guidelines: UN Department of Technical Co-operation for Development, stresses environmental stewardship in mining. UNCTAD: A project that integrates mining activity with planning for a sustainable future.

== Angola's economic development after the civil war ==
Due to Angola's vast quantity of natural resources, its GDP is currently growing at a rate of 16.3%. The growth that has occurred is due to the civil war finally being over, which has allowed American companies to come to the country to set up oil drills and open new diamond mines. But the economic growth of the country is not spreading to stimulate development in the population, 65% of whom live on one dollar a day. There are also millions of refugees and former Unita and MPLA soldiers living in camps across the country with malaria and dysentery widespread.

== Development for the future ==
To provide sustainable jobs and income for the millions of displaced Angolan people will involve developing agriculture and industry that does not rely on non-renewable resources. The price of diamonds dropped after large mines opened in Russia and China. Oil is not owned by the people, with uneven allocation of funds occurring between politicians and oil companies. Angola has large rivers and delta regions, which potentially could be dammed to create electricity for export to neighboring countries.

== Iron ore ==
Once a major export, iron ore was no longer being mined in Angola by the late 1980s, because of attendant security and transportation problems. From the mid-1950s to 1975, iron ore was mined in Malanje, Bié Province, Huambo, and Huíla provinces, and production reached an average of 5.7 million tons per year between 1970 and 1974. Most of the iron ore was shipped to Japan, West Germany, and Britain; it earned almost US$50 million a year in export revenue. After independence, the government established a state company, the National Iron Ore Company of Angola (Emprêsa Nacional de Ferro de Angola—Ferrangol), for exploration and mining, processing, and marketing of iron ore. Ferrangol contracted with Austromineral, an Austrian company, to repair its facilities and organize production in Cassinga in Huíla Province. Production began to slow in 1974 as a result of technical problems at the Cassinga mine and stopped completely in August 1975. The area fell under foreign control when South African forces invaded in 1975. Although South Africa withdrew its troops in early 1976, as of 1988 mining had not resumed in the area.

By 1988 the Cassinga mines had a production capacity of approximately 1.1 million tons per year. However, the railroad to the port of Moçâmedes (then called Namibe) needed extensive repair, and since it was located only 310 kilometers north of the Namibian border, security against South African attacks could not be ensured. Furthermore, UNITA was active in the area and posed a threat to the rail line if it were repaired. Even supposing these problems could be resolved, production of iron ore at Cassinga would be costly in view of the depressed state of the world steel market in the late 1980s.

== Other minerals ==
Angola is also rich in several other mineral resources that had not been fully exploited by the early twenty- first century. These include manganese, copper, gold, phosphates, granite, marble, uranium, quartz, lead, zinc, wolfram, tin, fluorite, sulfur, feldspar, kaolin, mica, asphalt, gypsum, and talc. The government hopes to resume mining in the southwest for crystalline quartz and ornamental marble. It has been estimated that 5,000 cubic meters of marble could be extracted annually for a period of twenty years. A state-owned company mined granite and marble in Huíla and Namibe Provinces, and in 1983 it produced 4,450 cubic meters of granite and 500 cubic meters of marble. Since then, the company has ceased production in order to re-tool with modern machinery. Quartz production, however, was suspended indefinitely because of the military situation in areas near the extraction sites in Cuanza Sul Province.

The government established a company in 1980 to exploit phosphate deposits in the northwest. There were 50 million tons of deposits in Zaire Province and about 100 million tons in Cabinda. Although studies of the deposits in both locations have been made by Bulgarian and Yugoslav companies, as of 1988 production had not started at either site.

== See also ==
- Catoca diamond mine
- Corruption in Angola
- Economy of Angola
- Energy in Angola
- Oil megaprojects (2016)
- Petroleum politics
