= Women's National Movement =

Women's right-wing organization in Portugal

- Movimento Nacional Feminino
- Abbreviation: MNF
- Formation: 22 January 1962; 64 years ago
- Founder: Cecília Supico Pinto
- Founded at: Lisbon, Portugal
- Dissolved: 22 July 1974; 52 years ago
- Type: Organization supporting Portugal’s colonial wars
- Purpose: Improving morale amongst troops
- Location: Lisbon, Portugal
- Leader: Cecília Supico Pinto
- Main organ: Presença; Guerrilha
- Subsidiaries: Angola; Cape Verde; Guinea-Bissau; Moxambique
- Funding: Government; sale of aerograms

The Women's National Movement (Portuguese: Movimento Nacional Feminino, MNF) (1961–1974) was an organization that supported the right-wing Estado Novo dictatorship in Portugal under the prime minister António de Oliveira Salazar. It focused on providing support for Portugal's colonial war in Angola, Guinea-Bissau and Mozambique and did not seek any changes in the condition of women under the Estado Novo. The members were all largely from the upper middle class in Portugal, who benefited most from the Salazar regime.

== History ==
On 22 January 1961 Henrique Galvão, a Portuguese military officer and political opponent of Salazar, organised the hijacking of the Santa Maria, Portugal's second-largest merchant vessel, which had 600 passengers and 300 crew. The hijacking occurred in the Caribbean Sea. It required an extensive air and sea search to discover the vessel's whereabouts in the Atlantic and to establish communications. Subsequently, a United States Navy fleet surrounded the Santa Maria some 80 km off Recife, Brazil. Negotiations eventually led to the ship sailing into Recife, with Galvão and his 24 fellow hijackers surrendering in exchange for political asylum.

The hijacking caused an uproar in Portugal and was considered a national disgrace. In addition to the Santa Maria event, throughout 1961 there had been several anti-colonialist demonstrations in Portugal and in the colonies, starting on 11 January 1961 in Cassange-Calucala in Angola with an uprising of African rural workers, who refused to work. More violent opposition began the following month under the auspices of the People's Movement for the Liberation of Angola (MPLA). This opposition to Portuguese colonial rule eventually led to military contingents being sent from Portugal, first to Angola in 1961, to be followed by Guinea in 1963 and Mozambique in 1964.

Among the responses to these events was that of Cecília Supico Pinto, wife of Luís Supico Pinto, a former minister under Salazar, who decided, together with around 25 other women, to form the Women's National Movement (MNF) to support the war effort in the colonies. Officially, the MNF was created on 28 April 1961, Salazar's birthday. It received government subsidies, as well as support from the Daughters of Charity of Saint Vincent de Paul, known as the Vincentians, which gave the MNF links to Catholic women throughout the country, and from the Instituto de Odivelas, a Portuguese military school for young women. Its aims of preserving the colonies initially received widespread support from all classes in Portugal, in part because of the considerable propaganda tactics employed by the regime. In addition to the national organization, the MNF had branch organizations in the colonies. Unlike the headquarters, which had considerable continuity in management, the colonial branches had significant turnover, because many of their leaders were the wives of military officers who were posted to Africa for a few years.

== Activities ==
In July 1961, General Manuel Gomes de Araújo, assistant undersecretary of the ministry of defence, appointed the MNF as the organization responsible for the supply and distribution of military aerograms, which the troops and their families could use to communicate with each other. Between 1961 and 1974, the MNF issued more than 300 million such aerograms. Yellow ones were free to the military and blue ones were sold at a low price to family members in Portugal, with the proceeds going to the MNF.

Another early MNF activity was the creation of "war godmothers", who were to provide moral and material support to soldiers and their families. This was inspired by a measure put in place by the Portuguese Women's Crusade and the Portuguese Women's Assistance to the Victims of War during World War I. Women were expected to write to their "godson" in service in Africa on a regular basis, instilling in him, among other aspects, pride in the service rendered to the country and transmitting to him the recognition of the people for his role in Africa. Qualifications for the godmothers were that they were over 21 years old, "morally fit, with a patriotic spirit, courageous, with the ability of sacrifice and, above all, having confidence in victory and knowing how to transmit that confidence". Although the total number of godmothers assigned amounted to 162,186 between 1961 and 1971, it was inadequate to meet the demand and the MNF lamented that "unfortunately, not all Portuguese women realized the very feminine characteristics of this activity".

MNF published, with little success, the magazines Presença and Guerrilha. The first was a publication directed by Luíza Manoel de Vilhena, and the second was a monthly magazine for military personnel, under the direction of Cecília Supico Pinto and with editors-in-chief, Martinho Simões and, later, Mário Matos Lemos. Only five issues of Presença, printing 5000 copies a time, were published between October 1963 and December 1965, and it then ceased publication. With an original plan that it should be published monthly, it was intended to function as a liaison for members and godmothers, informing all the women about the activities of the central committee and the other committees. However, the magazine experienced high production costs. Guerrilha was first issued a year later. It had 55 issues, the last one coming out in August 1973.

For Christmas 1971 the MNF released an album Natal, with the fado singers, Amália Rodrigues and Hermínia Silva, the football star, Eusébio, the radio host, Artur Agostinho, the actress Florbela Queirós and the actor, Francisco Nicholson. It was not a great success as few of the military in the colonies had turntables.

== Closure ==
The Carnation Revolution that overthrew the Estado Novo on 25 April 1974 was led by military officers who were unhappy with the continuation of the colonial war, which they considered could not be won. The new government immediately entered into discussions with the rebel movements of Angola, Mozambique, Guinea-Bissau and other colonies with a view to granting independence. The MNF thus became superfluous and closed on 22 July 1974.
