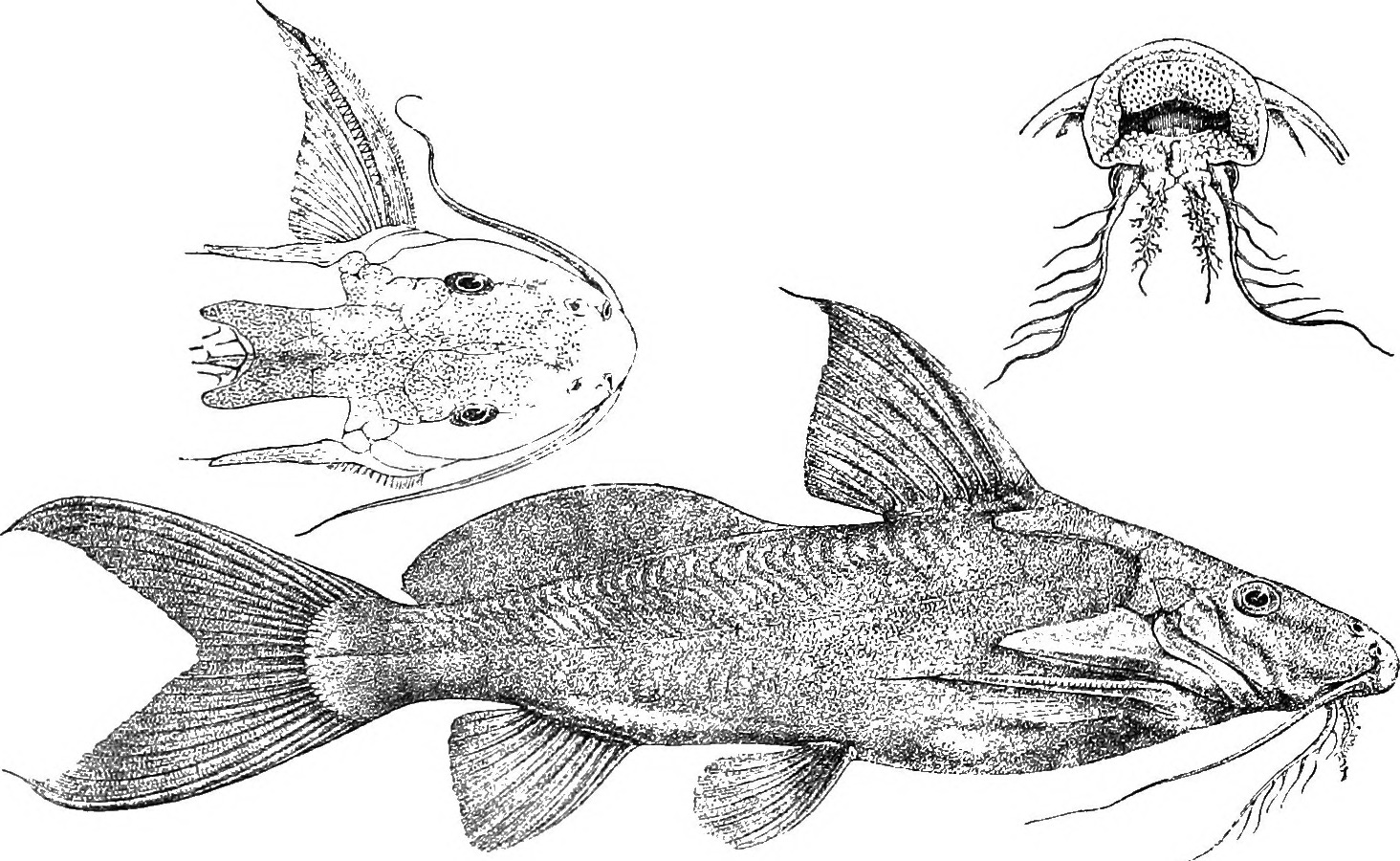

Conservation status
- Least Concern (IUCN 3.1)

Scientific classification
- Kingdom: Animalia
- Phylum: Chordata
- Class: Actinopterygii
- Order: Siluriformes
- Family: Mochokidae
- Genus: Synodontis
- Species: S. depauwi

Binomial name
- Synodontis depauwi Boulenger, 1899

= Synodontis depauwi =

Species of fish

Synodontis depauwi is a species of upside-down catfish that is endemic to the Democratic Republic of the Congo where it can be found in Stanley Pool. It was first described by British-Belgian zoologist George Albert Boulenger in 1899, from specimens collected in Stanley Pool, in the Democratic Republic of the Congo. The species name depauwi is in honour of the "conservateur des collections de l'Université libre de Bruxelles", Louis De Pauw.

== Description ==
Like all members of the genus Synodontis, S. depauwi has a strong, bony head capsule that extends back as far as the first spine of the dorsal fin. The head contains a distinct narrow, bony, external protrusion called a humeral process. The shape and size of the humeral process helps to identify the species. In S. depauwi, the humeral process is much longer than it is broad, with a ridge on the underside, and sharply pointed at the end.

The fish has three pairs of barbels. The maxillary barbels are on located on the upper jaw, and two pairs of mandibular barbels are on the lower jaw. The maxillary barbel is long and straight without any branches, without a membrane at the base. It extends to a length of about 1 1/4 to 1 1/3 times the length of the head. The outer pair of mandibular barbels is two to three times the length of the inner pair; and the outer pair with moderately long, slender branches and the inner pair with secondary branches present.

The front edges of the dorsal fins and the pectoral fins of Syntontis species are hardened into stiff spines. In S. depauwi, the spine of the dorsal fin is about 2/3 times the length of the head, nearly straight, sharp-edged in the front and serrated on the back. The remaining portion of the dorsal fin is made up of seven branching rays. The spine of the pectoral fin is a little longer than the size of the dorsal spine, and serrated on both sides. The adipose fin is 3 1/2 to 4 1/2 times as long as it is deep. The anal fin contains three unbranched and seven or eight branched rays. The tail, or caudal fin, is deeply forked, with the upper lobe longer.

All members of Syndontis have a structure called a premaxillary toothpad, which is located on the very front of the upper jaw of the mouth. This structure contains several rows of short, chisel-shaped teeth. In S. depauwi, the toothpad forms a short and broad band. On the lower jaw, or mandible, the teeth of Syndontis are attached to flexible, stalk-like structures and described as "s-shaped" or "hooked". The number of teeth on the mandible is used to differentiate between species; in S. depauwi, there are about 30 to 35 teeth on the mandible.

The body color is a uniform brownish, with black spots on the fins and a black streak along each lobe of the caudal fin. Juveniles may show dark marbling colors on the sides.

The maximum total length of the species is 24 centimetres (9.4 in). Generally, females in the genus Synodontis tend to be slightly larger than males of the same age.

== Habitat and behavior ==
In the wild, the species is known from Pool Malebo, and has been recorded in the Kasai River basin and the Kwango River Basin. The fish is caught for human consumption. The reproductive habits of most of the species of Synodontis are not known, beyond some instances of obtaining egg counts from gravid females. Spawning likely occurs during the flooding season between July and October, and pairs swim in unison during spawning. The growth rate is rapid in the first year, then slows down as the fish age.
