= Cafunfo Airport =

Airport in Lunda Norte, Angola

Aeroporto de Cafunfo
- IATA: CFF; ICAO: FNCF

Summary
- Airport type: Public
- Serves: Cafunfo
- Location: Angola
- Elevation AMSL: 2,775 ft / 846 m
- Coordinates: 8°47′00″S 17°59′25″E

Map
- Location of Aeroporto de Cafunfo in Angola

Runways
| Direction | Length | | Surface |
| Direction | m | ft | Surface |
|---|---|---|---|
| 06/24 | 2,612 | 8,570 | Gravel |
- Source: GCM Landings.com Google Maps

Cafunfo Airport (IATA: CFF, ICAO: FNCF) is an airport serving Cafunfo, in Lunda Norte Province, Angola.

The Cafunfo non-directional beacon (Ident: CF) is located on the field.

== See also ==
- List of airports in Angola
- Transport in Angola
