= Cecília Supico Pinto =

Portuguese supporter of Estado Novo dictatorship and colonial wars

- Born: Cecília Maria de Castro Pereira de Carvalho; 30 May 1921; Lisbon, Portugal
- Died: 25 May 2011 Aged 89; Cascais
- Other names: Cecília Maria de Castro Pereira de Carvalho Supico Pinto
- Known for: Founder and president of the Movimento Nacional Feminino
- Spouse: Clotário Luís Supico Ribeiro Pinto
- Children: None

Cecília Supico Pinto, popularly known as Cilinha (1921-2011) was the founder, president and mouthpiece of the Portuguese Women's National Movement (Movimento Nacional Feminino – MNF), an organization that supported Portugal's Estado Novo dictatorship. During the Portuguese Colonial War, in which the country was fighting to protect its colonies from liberation movements, the MNF provided moral and material support to the military.

== Early life ==
Cecília Maria de Castro Pereira de Carvalho Supico Pinto was born in the Portuguese capital of Lisbon on 30 May 1921. She was the first of four daughters of Manuel António do Casal-Ribeiro de Carvalho, of the family of the Viscounts of Chanceleiros. Pinto claimed that at the age of seven she could speak three languages fluently. She attended the nursing school of Saint Vincent de Paul in Lisbon. She was a childhood friend of the Portuguese poet and writer Sophia de Mello Breyner Andresen. In April 1945, Pinto married Clotário Luís Supico Ribeiro Pinto, who was 13 years older than she. They had no children. He became a member of the Estado Novo government and was a good friend of the dictatorship's leader António de Oliveira Salazar. Her husband's father was Liberato Pinto, a former prime minister of Portugal.

== National Women's Movement ==
Pinto, already at the top of the Estado Novo social hierarchy, founded the National Women's Movement in 1961, officially on 28 April, the birthday of Salazar. It drew its initial membership almost entirely from the upper-middle and upper classes. The first meeting was held in a small room in Luís de Camões square in Lisbon. The number of members eventually grew to more than 80,000. Pinto achieved significant popularity and came to have strong political influence with Salazar, who she first met through her husband. As Salazar was single and the president of the National Assembly, Albino dos Reis, was a widower, she was often asked to acy as Portugal's "first lady". The role she played within the Estado Novo meant that she was sometimes referred to as "Salazar in skirts".

Activities carried out included the successful promotion of aerograms, for use by the troops to write home, which did not require stamps. Between 1961 and 1974 the MNF distributed more than 300 million aerograms. MNF published a long-play disc for Christmas in 1971 for distribution to soldiers in the colonies, bringing together performances and messages by various famous Portuguese, including the fado singer Amália Rodrigues, the footballer Eusébio, the actress Florbela Queirós and the actor Francisco Nicholson. This is likely to have had limited impact as turntables were scarce. More appreciated, perhaps, MNF also sent tobacco and magazines. At its headquarters, in Rua das Janelas Verdes, in Lisbon, a small MNF radio studio broadcast the programme Espaço to Angola, Mozambique and Guinea-Bissau. MNF was also successful in influencing policy regarding the treatment of the troops and the families of those killed in battle.

Pinto was also well known for her visits to the combat areas. She would wear camouflage, sleep in field tents, and sometimes have to escape enemy fire by going into the forest with the military. Her motto was "For God and for the Fatherland". She would often travel to the colonies with large quantities of flowers to give to the armed forces. An indication of the importance she achieved within just a short time of the founding of the MNF is that when she flew from Lisbon to Angola in 1964, she was seen off at the airport by the ministers of defence, the army, the navy and the secretary of state for the air force, as well as by the president of regime's Corporative Chamber, who at the time was her husband. At the same time as achieving this importance, it was noted that she worked for and with men, considered a socially reprehensible act in the conservative Portugal of the time. Her closeness to the regime did not prevent her phone from being tapped by the secret police.

The reactions of the military to the activities of the MNF and to visits to Africa by Pinto were varied. The armed forces were becoming politicised and were unhappy about being required to fight the colonial wars. In some cases, the MNF was attacked as a way to attack the regime. Following the stroke suffered by Salazar in 1968 and his death in 1970, Pinto lost her power base. She had a poor relationship with Marcelo Caetano, who took over from Salazar in 1968, and feared he would put an end to the wars. The Carnation Revolution in April 1974, which overthrew the Estado Novo, was initiated by discontented members of the armed forces. The MNF was wound up soon after.

== Later life ==
Cecília Supico Pinto then withdrew from public life. She died in Cascais on 25 May 2011. In the mid-2000s she agreed to be interviewed by Sílvia Espírito Santo, who published a biography in 2008.
