= Cuango, Angola =

Cuango
- Municipality and town
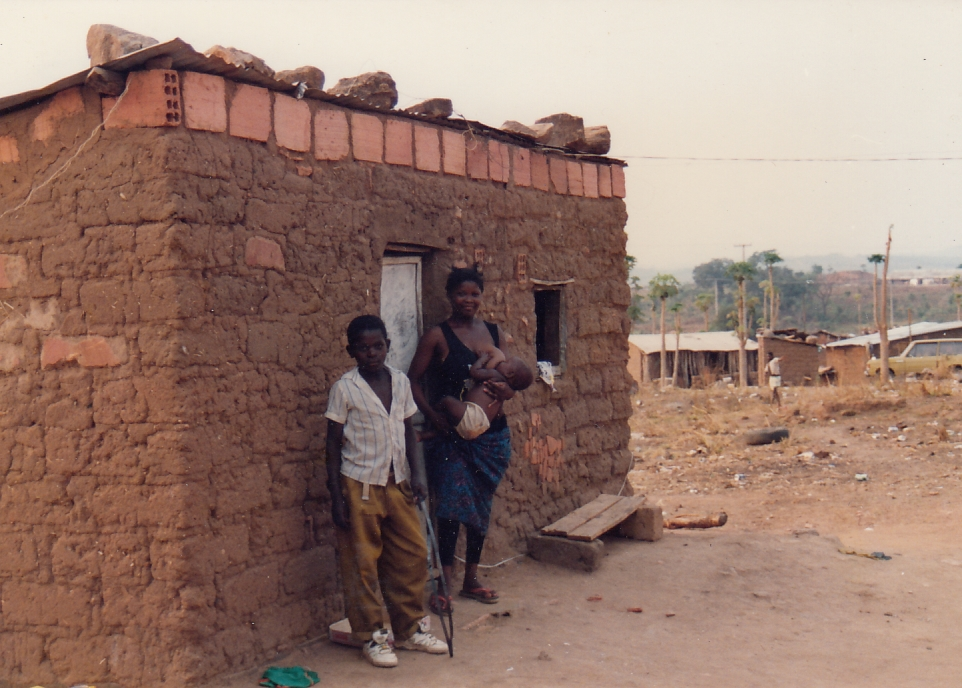
- Typical housing on the outskirts of Vila de Luzamba

- Location in Angola
- Coordinates: 9°8′40″S 18°2′47″E
- Country: Angola
- Province: Lunda Norte Province

Population (2014 Census)
  - Municipality and town: 183,767
  - Urban: 55,000
- Time zone: UTC+1 (WAT)
- Climate: Aw

Cuango, also Cuango-Luzamba or Luzamba, is a town, commune, and municipality in Lunda Norte Province in Angola. The municipality had a population of 183,767 in 2014. It is served by Luzamba Airport.

== Notable communities ==
The municipality of Cuango contains the town of Cafunfo and, the commune of Luremo. The town of Cuango-Luzamba is located in the extreme southwest of the municipality.
