= Lubalo =

- Municipality and town
- Location in Angola
- Coordinates: 9°9′S 19°17′E
- Country: Angola
- Province: Lunda Norte Province

Population (2014 Census)
  - Total: 20,631
- Time zone: UTC+1 (WAT)
- Climate: Aw

Lubalo is a town and municipality in Lunda Norte Province in Angola. The municipality had a population of 20,631 in 2014.
