= Adriano Makevela Mackenzie =

Angolan general

- Spouse: Anabela Chissende
- Military career
- Allegiance: FAA
- Rank: general

General Adriano Makevela Mackenzie is a prominent Angolan general in the Lunda Norte Province.

== Military career ==
Mackenzie served as a military leader with National Union for the Total Independence of Angola (Unita). He defected from UNITA in 1992, during the Angolan Civil War. Previously part of UNITA, Mackenzie's forces have been largely integrated into the FAA under the Lusaka Protocol.

Mackenzie serves as the head of military training at the joint chiefs of staff of FAA, and head of reconnaissance and information.

== Civilian activities ==
He was one of six equal founding members of Lumanhe Extração Mineira, Importação e Exportação (commonly called "the generals’ company", since five of the six are generals), a diamond mining operation. His average income since then has been $2 million per year. Its cumulative profits since 1995, when it was founded, have been $120 million.

Mackenzie's company has a 15% stake in the Sociedade Mineira do Cuango.

== Family and personal life ==
His wife, Anabela Chissende, sits on the board of Sadisse.
