= Lóvua =

- Municipality
- Location in Angola
- Coordinates: 7°20′40″S 20°10′25″E
- Country: Angola
- Province: Lunda Norte Province

Area
  - Total: 7,200 km^{2} (2,800 sq mi)

Population (mid 2019)
  - Total: 15,124
  - Density: 2.1/km^{2} (5.4/sq mi)
- Time zone: UTC+1 (WAT)

Lóvua is an Angolan municipality, with a population of 13,033 (2014 census), located in the province of Lunda Norte.
