= Human trafficking in Angola =

Angola ratified the 2000 UN TIP Protocol in September 2014.

Angola is a source and destination country for men, women, and children subjected to trafficking in persons, specifically conditions of forced prostitution and forced labor. Internally, trafficking victims are forced to labor in agriculture, construction, domestic servitude, and reportedly in artisanal diamond mines. Angolan women and children more often become victims of internal rather than transnational sex trafficking. Women and children are trafficked to South Africa, the Democratic Republic of the Congo (DRC), Namibia, and European nations, primarily Portugal. Traffickers take boys to Namibia for forced labor in cattle herding. Children are also forced to act as couriers in illegal cross-border trade between Namibia and Angola as part of a scheme to skirt import fees. Illegal migrants from the DRC voluntarily enter Angola's diamond-mining districts, where some are later reportedly subjected to forced labor or prostitution in the mining camps.

The Government of Angola is making significant efforts to combat trafficking. The government has educated the public about the dangers of trafficking in Angola, amended its Constitution to specifically prohibit human trafficking, and maintained its level of funding for anti-trafficking activities despite a significant drop in national revenue and subsequent cuts to its national budget. The government has taken some proactive steps to prevent human trafficking during an international soccer tournament, identified trafficking victims, trained more counter-trafficking investigators and agents, and increased enforcement at key trafficking border crossings. Trafficking offenders, however, are rarely if ever prosecuted, and services for victims remain minimal.

The U.S. State Department's Office to Monitor and Combat Trafficking in Persons placed the country in "Tier 2" in 2017 and 2023.

In 2023, the Organised Crime Index gave the country a score of 6 out of 10 for human trafficking, noting higher levels of this crime, and ineffective help for victims.

== Prosecution ==
Angola does not have a law that specifically prohibits all forms of trafficking in persons, though the new Constitution promulgated on February 5, 2010 prohibits the trafficking in humans and organs. The Penal Code has not yet been amended to reflect these provisions in a way which would allow officials to enforce them against trafficking offenders. Articles 390-395 of the Penal Code prohibit forced prostitution and forced or bonded labor, prescribing penalties of two to eight years' imprisonment, which are commensurate with penalties prescribed for other serious offenses. Statistics on investigations or criminal convictions are not made publicly available. The government has strengthened its partnership with the International Organization for Migration, through which it provided for the training of police officers, law enforcement officials, prosecutors, NGOs, and stakeholders in trafficking awareness and effective measures to counter trafficking. At the local level, police and military officials have been implicated in facilitating the illegal entry of foreigners into the diamond-mining provinces of Lunda North and Lunda South, some of whom reportedly become victims of forced labor or prostitution in the mining camps. The UN Joint Human Rights Office reported in May 2009 that Congolese officials broke up a sex trafficking ring that had "sold" more than 30 trafficked women and girls to Angolan military personnel in Cabinda province. Despite this, no investigations or prosecutions of officials for complicity in human trafficking were reported.

== Protection ==
The Government of Angola has sustained modest efforts to ensure that victims of trafficking received access to assistance. The government continues to rely heavily upon religious, civil society, and international organizations to protect and assist victims of trafficking; authorities identified and referred 33 victims of labor trafficking to care providers in the last three months of 2009. NGOs credit this recent increase in the number of identified victims with more public awareness and better reporting, rather than an increase in the occurrence of trafficking in Angola. In partnership with UNICEF, the government's National Children's Council (INAC) continued to operate 18 Child Protection Networks (CPNs), which serve as crisis "SOS Centers" for victims of trafficking and other crimes who are between the ages of 9 and 16. There were no apparent victim services available for child victims under the age of nine. The CPNs offered rescue services, health, legal and social assistance, and family reunification. Government personnel referred an unspecified number of suspected victims over the age of 16 to shelters and services provided by the Organization of Angolan Women (OMA), an NGO that receives government support. Law enforcement, immigration, and social services personnel do not have a formal system of proactively identifying victims of trafficking among high-risk persons with whom they come in contact. The government does not offer victims long-term assistance, nor does it offer temporary or permanent residency to foreign victims of trafficking. Draft anti-trafficking legislation currently includes provisions to provide foreign trafficking victims with the same kind of social assistance, residence, and legal protection provided to asylum seekers. Under Angolan law, victims of sex trafficking may bring criminal charges against their traffickers, but may not seek compensation. The law does, however, provide for compensation to victims of forced or bonded labor. Current laws do not provide legal alternatives to the removal of foreign victims to countries where they may face hardship or retribution, or relief from prosecution for crimes committed as a direct result of being trafficked.

== Prevention ==
The Angolan government has made modest efforts to prevent trafficking. High-ranking Ministry of Interior (MOI) and other officials have made public statements condemning trafficking and raised awareness of the issue. In October 2009, the government conducted and partially funded, in concert with IOM, a national conference on the prevention of human trafficking in preparation for the 2010 Africa Cup of Nations football tournament (CAN 2010), which Angola hosted in January 2010. The MOI, in partnership with IOM, ran a soccer-themed public awareness campaign entitled "Drop the Red Flag on Human Trafficking", featuring flyers and billboards in Portuguese, English, and French. The MOI hired a private sector consultant to help develop its counter-trafficking strategy for CAN 2010, and sought technical assistance from Interpol and the Governments of Germany, Portugal, Brazil, and South Africa. The MOI also coordinated with IOM to provide counter-trafficking training to officials from INAC and the Ministries of Ministry of Social Assistance and Reintegration, Justice, and Foreign Affairs. In partnership with IOM and the Embassy of Norway in Luanda, the MOI funded and distributed trafficking awareness pamphlets targeted to vulnerable populations. The Association of Women's Police Officers trained other police officers to recognize child traffickers and exploiters in preparation for the CAN 2010 games. As part of its anti-trafficking campaign during the CAN 2010, the government made some efforts to reduce the demand for commercial sex acts, particularly child prostitution. Angola is not a party to the 2000 UN Protocol to Prevent, Suppress and Punish Trafficking in Persons, especially Women and Children.
