= Xa Cassau =

Coordinates: 8°56′S 20°17′E

- commune
- Location in Angola
- Country: Angola
- Province: Lunda Norte
- Time zone: UTC+1 (WAT)

Xa Cassau is a town and commune of Angola, located in the province of Lunda Norte.

== See also ==
- Communes of Angola
