= Muvulege =

Coordinates: 9°00′S 18°46′E

- commune
- Location in Angola
- Country: Angola
- Province: Lunda Norte
- Time zone: UTC+1 (WAT)

Muvulege is a town and commune of Angola, located in the province of Lunda Norte.

== See also ==
- Communes of Angola
