= Cuilo =

- Municipality and town
- Location in Angola
- Coordinates: 10°3′S 19°31′E
- Country: Angola
- Province: Lunda Norte Province

Population (2014 Census)
  - Total: 21,004
- Time zone: UTC+1 (WAT)
- Climate: Aw

Cuilo is a town and municipality in Lunda Norte Province in Angola. The municipality had a population of 21,004 in 2014.

== Distances ==
The following table gives the distance from Cuilo to each of the twenty-five largest cities of Angola. Distance (Km)

Cuilo - Luanda	  702 km
Cuilo - Huambo	  511 km
Cuilo - Lobito	  693 km
Cuilo - Benguela  723 km
Cuilo - Kuito	  383 km
Cuilo - Lubango	  848 km
Cuilo - Malanje	  352 km
Cuilo - Moçâmedes 983 km
Cuilo - Soyo	  900 km
Cuilo - Saint Antonio Do Zaire	900 km
Cuilo - Kabinda	  949 km
Cuilo - Uige	  561 km
Cuilo - Saurimo	  107 km
Cuilo - Sumbe	  634 km
Cuilo - Caluquembe	  670 km
Cuilo - Caluquembo	  670 km
Cuilo - Caxito	  663 km
Cuilo - Kashito	  663 km
Cuilo - Longonjo  563 km
Cuilo - Congonjo  563 km
Cuilo - Cahala	  532 km
Cuilo - Luene	  198 km
Cuilo - Lucapa	  227 km
Cuilo - General Machado	  312 km
Cuilo - Menonguey 550 km
