= Caungula =

- Municipality and town
- Location in Angola
- Coordinates: 8°5′S 19°5′E
- Country: Angola
- Province: Lunda Norte Province

Population (2014 Census)
  - Total: 28,164
- Time zone: UTC+1 (WAT)
- Climate: Aw

Caungula is a town and municipality in Lunda Norte Province in Angola. The municipality had a population of 28,164 in 2014.
