= Rafael Marques de Morais =

Angolan investigative journalist and anti-corruption activist

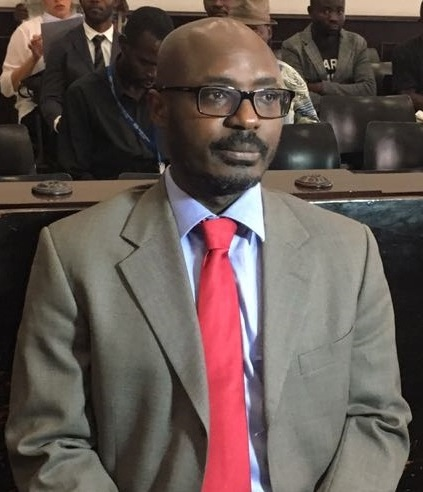
- Photo of Rafael Marques de Morais
- Born: August 31, 1971 (age 55); Luanda, Angola
- Education: Goldsmiths, University of London (BA); St Antony's College, Oxford (MSc)
- Occupation: Journalist
- Employer: Open Society Foundations (1997–2004)
- Organization: Maka Angola
- Known for: Reporting on corruption, human rights and conflict diamonds in Angola.
- Awards: Percy Qoboza Award 2000; Civil Courage Prize 2006; Gerald Loeb Award 2014; Index on Censorship Freedom of Expression Award 2015

Rafael Marques de Morais (born 1971) is an Angolan investigative journalist and anti-corruption activist who received several international awards for his reporting on conflict diamonds and government corruption in Angola. He has headed the anti-corruption watchdog Maka Angola since 2008. He was also a director of the Friends of Angola human rights lobbying organisation, and established the UFOLO Center of Studies for a Good Governance in Luanda.

== Biography ==
=== Early career ===
While growing up, Marques became disturbed by the worsening state of his country: “I had never heard of a lawyer, [had] no idea of what human rights were, no idea of what fighting corruption was”, he later recalled. “I realised that the way of addressing the issues that concerned me was by being a journalist.”

He received a BA (Hons) degree in Anthropology and Media from Goldsmiths, University of London.

He started work as a journalist in 1992 at the state-owned newspaper Jornal de Angola. Shortly after joining the editorial team, Marques wrote an article on the forthcoming presidential election in which he quoted an opposition leader's criticism of dos Santos. He did not intend for the quotation to be published in the newspaper, but through some editorial error it did appear in the paper. Marques was punished with a transfer to the local news desk. Owing to his continued “tendency to inject unwelcome social commentary into even the driest reportage”, he continued to be demoted. One day, assigned to write about the latest national statistics, he included political analysis. “And that was the last straw”, he later told a reporter. He was fired.

=== Open Society Foundations ===
In 1997, after a personal approach from George Soros, Marques agreed to help establish the activities of Open Society Foundations in Angola. He was appointed the temporary national representative of the organisation, which collaborated with the Ministry of Education in training primary school teachers in the country, and he renewed his contract annually until leaving in December 2004. During his seven-year term, he was instrumental in organising seminars, lectures and initiatives to promote the concepts of human rights and democracy across the country.

In 1998 the Angolan Civil War resumed. In 1999 shortly after publishing the opinion piece “Cannon Fodder” Marques began collecting signatures on a petition calling for an end to the war. He was attacked on radio and in the press.

==== "The Lipstick of Dictatorship" ====
On 3 July 1999, the weekly magazine Agora published an article by Marques entitled "The Lipstick of Dictatorship" (a play on words based on the Portuguese term for a police baton). In it, he criticized Angolan President José Eduardo dos Santos. Marques called Dos Santos a dictator and charged him with destroying Angola and with promoting “incompetence, embezzlement and corruption as political and social values". Three months later, on 16 October, Marques was arrested at his home in Luanda and charged with defamation.

He was held for forty days without charges and was not permitted to contact his family or a lawyer. At night “the police would burst in, wake him up, and try to force him to sign blank documents that could later be doctored against him.” When he refused, they denied him food and water. Marques went on a hunger strike that went public. As a result he was transferred to another prison, where he was given food, but where his cell was so crowded that “the prisoners slept leaning up against the walls which were crawling with lice.”

Thanks to rising international pressure on Angola spurred by the efforts of the Open Society Institute, Marques was released on bail on 25 November, on the condition that he remain in Luanda and not speak to journalists or make public statements. On 15 December, without explanation, the Luanda Provincial Court transferred his case to the Supreme Court of Angola.

According to the Committee to Protect Journalists, dos Santos's government thereupon “began a campaign of verbal abuse against Marques,” citing a statement by legislator Mendes de Carvalho, during a 19 January 2000 parliamentary debate on press freedom, that if Marques kept criticizing dos Santos, he “would not live to the age of 40.”

==== 2000 trial ====
His trial began on 9 March 2000. He was charged under Angola's Law 7/78, also known as the Law on Crimes Against State Security. The Committee to Protect Journalists charged that “Law 7/78 violates Article 35 of the 1992 Angolan Constitution, which guarantees the right to freedom of expression.”

Although it had been scheduled to be heard before the Supreme Court, Marques' case was referred back to the Criminal Divisional Court, where it was heard before Joaquim de Abreu Cangato, a former member of Angola's secret police with no legal training. On 10 March the trial was adjourned until 21 March. On that date, Cangato ordered spectators, including US and Portuguese embassy officials, human-rights activists, and journalists, to leave the courtroom, after which the trial continued in secrecy.

On 31 March, Marques was found guilty of the charge of abuse of the press, resulting in an “injury” to the President. He was sentenced to six months' imprisonment, but remained free pending an appeal. He was also fined US$17,000.

The US State Department expressed concern that Marques had not received a fair trial. The US-based Committee to Protect Journalists "strongly condemned" the prosecution. On 27 October, under international pressure, the Supreme Court changed Marques's sentence to a suspended sentence on the condition that he not write anything defamatory about the government for the following five years. He was also ordered to pay damages to the President, and his passport was confiscated until the end of February 2001.

==== Civil war activism ====
Following the defamation incident, Marques focused on ending the Angolan Civil War, organizing a coalition of 250 civic and religious leaders to call for peaceful resolution. On 14 July 2001, he was detained again after visiting evicted people in a resettlement camp outside of Luanda with BBC reporter Justin Pearce; the people in the camp had been forcibly evicted from a neighborhood in the city that had apparently been rezoned for commercial development.

Between 1999 and 2002, Marques wrote a series of articles about the trade in conflict diamonds in Luanda Province and corruption in Cabinda Province, a major oil center. According to his Civil Courage Prize citation, "his unvarnished criticisms of the Angolan army's brutality and the malfeasance of the government and foreign oil interests put him at extreme personal risk."

In 2003 he wrote Cabinda: A Year of Pain, a catalog of hundreds of human rights abuses allegedly inflicted on the populace by government forces and others. In early 2004, acting on behalf of Open Society Foundations, he was involved in registering Mpalabanda – Civic Association of Cabinda (Mpalabanda - Associação Cívica de Cabinda, MACC), the province's first human rights organisation, banned for allegedly pursuing a political agenda and inciting violence and hatred in July 2006, during talks between the government and the umbrella organisation Cabinda Forum for Dialogue, of which MACC formed a part.

In 2003, Marques coordinated a campaign in Angola under the slogan "Peace without democracy is fantasy" (Paz sem democracia, é fantasia). He also co-organised a symposium on Angola in Lisbon with support from the Mário Soares Foundation. It was reported that as relations between the Angolan government and George Soros improved in 2004, against the background of Angola's need for loans from the International Monetary Fund, the OSF head was asked to replace Marques to cement the rapprochement.

=== Maka Angola ===
In 2008, Marques launched an anti-corruption website called Maka Angola thanks to a grant from the National Endowment for Democracy.

In 2009, he graduated with an MSc in African Studies from St Antony's College, University of Oxford.

In several human rights reports and in the September 2011 book Blood Diamonds: Corruption and Torture in Angola, he described the killing and terrorizing of villagers by private security companies and Angolan military officials in the name of protecting mining operations. In November 2011 he issued a criminal complaint accusing nine Angolan generals of crimes against humanity in connection with diamond mining.

He was a Reagan-Fascell Democracy Fellow at the National Endowment for Democracy in Washington, DC in 2011, and a visiting scholar at the African Studies Department of the School of Advanced International Studies, Johns Hopkins University, in Washington in 2012. He also became a board member of the Goree Institute in Dakar, Senegal.

By 2021, he was a director of the human rights lobbying organisation Friends of Angola, operating from Washington, DC.

In March 2021, after establishing the UFOLO Center of Studies for a Good Governance (UFOLO - Centro de Estudos para a Boa Governação), he inserted himself as a mediator into the Lunda separatist conflict in north-east Angola by organising a series of meetings that brought together the families of killed participants in the 30 January 2021 armed attack on the Cafunfo police station, the local civil society of the Lunda Norte Province, the state diamond mining company ENDIAMA and the governor of Lunda Norte Ernesto Muangala. He launched his own investigation into the 30 January attack, concluded in October 2021 with a book-length report titled Miséria & magia. Revolta em Cafunfo, published by Edições de Angola in 2,000 copies. In it, he explained that separatist claims lacked historical legitimacy, and accused both the state and the separatist movement of neglecting the social and economic development of Lunda. The secretary general of the Movement of the Portuguese Protectorate of Lunda Chokwe (Movimento do Protetorado Português da Lunda Tchokwe, MPPLT) separatist faction, Fiel Muaco, alleged that Marques had turned against the movement after the Lunda "king" Muana Capenda Camulemba refused to back him to run for president of Angola.

== Other professional activities ==
Marques has participated in a number of international conferences and seminars, including "Transitions: A Conversation with National Leaders," sponsored by New York University and the International Peace Academy and held in New York in March 2005; "Beyond 'Conflict Diamonds:' a New Report on Human Rights and Angolan Diamonds," held at the Woodrow Wilson Center for International Scholars in Washington, DC, on 24 March 2005; and "Angola's Oil Curse," at the Post-Nobel Conference on "Oil Revenues – From Curse to Blessing for Developing Countries?”, held on 17 December 2004.

== Recognition ==
Marques received the Percy Qoboza Award of the US National Association of Black Journalists in 2000. In 2006, he received the Civil Courage Prize from the Northcote Parkinson Fund, which recognizes "steadfast resistance to evil at great personal risk — rather than military valor". In 2011, Human Rights Watch recognised his contribution to freedom of expression in Angola with a Hellman/Hammett grant. In 2015, Marques received the Index on Censorship Freedom of Expression Award.

On October 1, 2015, Rafael Marques de Morais was declared a recipient of the 2015 Allard Prize for International Integrity, sharing the CDN$100,000 prize with co-recipient John Githongo. Commenting at the time of his nomination, Marques said “It is a boost for my work, and an important break in my isolation and regular harassment. It also provides a ray of hope for Angolans who believe in the importance of exposing corruption as a criminal offense and the main scourge of society.”

Marches shared the 2014 Gerald Loeb Award for International business journalism for "The Shortest Route to Riches." He was listed among the 25 Africans to Watch by the Financial Times in 2015.

In May 2018, the International Press Institute awarded Marques the World Press Freedom Hero prize, commending him for his "dedication to pursuing truth at all costs".
