= Xá-Muteba =

- Municipality and town
- Location in Angola
- Coordinates: 09°31′S 17°49′E
- Country: Angola
- Province: Lunda Norte Province

Population (2014 Census)
  - Total: 68,114
- Time zone: UTC+1 (WAT)
- Climate: Aw

Xá-Muteba (Portuguese spelling) or Shah-Muteba (Bantu spelling) is a town and municipality in Lunda Norte Province in Angola. The municipality had a population of 68,114 in 2014.
