= Cachimo =

Coordinates: 8°21′S 21°20′E

- commune
- Location in Angola
- Country: Angola
- Province: Lunda Norte
- Time zone: UTC+1 (WAT)

Cachimo is a town and commune of Angola, located in the province of Lunda Norte.

== See also ==
- Communes of Angola
