= Capenda-Camulemba =

- Municipality and town
- Location in Angola
- Coordinates: 09°25′24″S 18°25′58″E
- Country: Angola
- Province: Lunda Norte Province

Population (2014 Census)
  - Total: 58,285
- Time zone: UTC+1 (WAT)
- Climate: Aw

Capenda-Camulemba is a town and municipality in Lunda Norte Province in Angola. The municipality had a population of 58,285 in 2014.
