= Minister of Energy and Water (Angola) =

Minister of Energy and Water of Angola is a cabinet level position in the national government. The position was established in 1975 with Ambrósio Lukoki.

== Name changes ==
- 1975–1983: Minister of Energy
- 1984–1991: Minister of Energy and Petroleum
- 1991–1997: Secretary of State for Energy and Water
- 1997–present: Minister of Energy and Water

== Ministers of Energy and Water ==
- 1980–1989: Pedro de Castro Van Dúnem
- 1989–1991: Zeferino Cassa Yombo
- 1991–1991: João Lourenço Landoite
- 1991–1992: Joaquim Quelhas Mesquita Mota
- 1992–2002: João Moreira Pinto Saraiva
- 2002–2009: José Maria Botelho de Vasconcelos
- 2009–2011: Emmanuela Bernardeth Afonso Vieira Lopes
- 2011–present: João Baptista Borges
