= Freedom of religion in Angola =

While the constitution of Angola provides for freedom of religion, the government imposes onerous criteria on religious groups for official recognition, this recognition being required for the legal construction of houses of worship. There are no registered Muslim groups in Angola.

== Religious demography ==
The country has a total area of 1,246,690 square kilometres (481,351 sq mi), and its population of 19 million. Christianity is the religion of the vast majority of the population, with Catholicism as the largest single religious group. The Catholic Church estimates that 55 percent of the population is Catholic. Data from the National Institute for Religious Affairs (INAR), under the Ministry of Culture, indicate the major Protestant traditions, including the Methodists, Baptists, Congregationalists (United Church of Christ), and Assemblies of God, are present in the country but are declining in strength, with an estimated membership of 10 percent of the population. African Christian denominations are gaining membership and 25 percent of the population are believed to be followers. Five percent are believed to belong to the various Evangelical churches, some of them of Brazilian origin. A small portion of the rural population practices animism or traditional indigenous religions. There is also a small Muslim community, estimated at 80–90,000 adherents, composed largely of migrants from West Africa and families of Lebanese extraction Traditional African religions are adhered to by a few peripheral rural societies only, but some traditional beliefs are held by many people.

Foreign missionaries have operated freely throughout the country since independence. During the last colonial decades, Protestant missionaries have sometimes been subject to certain limitations.

== Status of religious freedom ==
=== Legal and policy framework ===
The Constitution provides for freedom of religion, and the Government generally respected this right in practice. The Government at all levels sought to protect this right in full and did not tolerate its abuse, either by governmental or private actors.

The Government requires religious groups to petition for legal status with the Ministries of Justice and Culture. Legal status gives religious groups the right to act as juridical persons in the court system, secures their standing as officially registered religious groups, and allows them to construct schools and churches. Groups must provide general background information and have at least 100,000 adult adherents to qualify for registration.

The Christian holy days of Christmas and Good Friday are national holidays with no negative impact on other religious groups.

Public schools do not require religious instruction. The Government permits religious organizations and missions with legal status to establish and operate schools.

=== Restrictions on religious freedom ===
Government policy and practice contributed to the generally free practice of religion.

The Ministries of Justice and Culture currently recognize 85 denominations. More than 800 other religious organizations, many of which are Congolese- or Brazilian-based Christian evangelical groups, have registration applications pending with INAR. They do not meet the membership requirement of at least 100,000 members and are not eligible to receive legal status, but the Government has not barred their activity. INAR reported that the Muslim community, represented by the Central Mosque of Luanda, was close to meeting the registration requirements and was soon expected to gain official legal status.

Members of the clergy regularly use their pulpits to criticize government policies, though church leaders report self-censorship regarding particularly sensitive issues. The Catholic Church-owned Radio Ecclesia is broadcast in Luanda Province and frequently hosted spirited debates that spanned the political spectrum and were at times quite critical of government policies. The Media Law, however, requires nonpublic radio networks to have a physical presence in a province to broadcast there. Due to its limited financial capacity, this requirement affects Radio Ecclesia's ability to expand outside of Luanda.

The Government banned 17 religious groups in Cabinda on charges of practicing harmful exorcism rituals on adults and children accused of witchcraft, illegally holding religious services in residences, and not being registered. Although the law does not recognize the existence of witchcraft, abusive actions committed while practicing a religion are illegal. Members of these groups were not harassed, but two leaders were convicted in 2006 of child abuse and sentenced to 8 years' imprisonment.

There were no reports of religious prisoners or detainees in the country.

In 2022, Freedom House rated Angola’s religious freedom as 2 out of 4, noting that the constitution guarantees religious freedom, but the government imposes heavy criteria on religious groups for official recognition, which is required for the legal construction of houses of worship; many Pentecostal churches, and all Muslim groups, remain unregistered. A 2021 report stated that there are 81 recognized religious groups and more than 1,100 unrecognized religious groups in the country; the government has not officially recognized any new religious organization since 2000.

=== Forced religious conversion ===
There were no reports of forced religious conversion, including of minor U.S. citizens who had been abducted or illegally removed from the United States, or of the refusal to allow such citizens to be returned to the United States.

=== Improvements and positive developments in respect for religious freedom ===
In February 2006 the Government closed three mosques for holding services that authorities claimed disrupted public order by impeding the flow of traffic. Local Muslim leaders worked with INAR to negotiate an agreement which allowed all mosques to reopen by December 2006.

The Catholic Church confirmed that the Government agreed to fund the construction of schools and churches in restitution for property seized during the Angolan civil war.

== Societal abuses and discrimination ==
There were no reports of societal abuses or discrimination based on religious belief or practice.

Although public attitudes toward Islam were generally negative, cultural differences between Angolan and Muslim West African immigrants were generally cited as the basis for negative views toward Islam, rather than religious intolerance. On the whole, Islam is a very minor issue in Angola, because of the extremely small proportion of Muslims in the country as well as in all neighbouring countries.

Governmental agencies, church groups, and civil society organizations continued campaigns against traditional religions that involve shamans, employ animal sacrifices, or were identified as practicing witchcraft. The focus of these various programs was on abusive practices that can sometimes stem from traditional indigenous religious groups, not campaigns against witchcraft overall. Various government agencies held workshops and seminars on child abuse while church-related organizations focused on the doctrinal issues related to such practices as animal sacrifices or the use of shamans. There were periodic reports of child and elder abuse stemming from accusations of witchcraft, generally in rural areas and smaller cities. In some instances these accusations led to exorcism rituals that included willful neglect and physical abuse. In some cases deaths have been reported. Current cases remained under investigation; however, in the past authorities have arrested and prosecuted those who have abused, injured, or reportedly killed others accused of witchcraft.

== See also ==
- Religion in Angola
