= Kwango River =

River in Central Africa; forms part of the border between Angola and the DRC

Kwango River Rio Cuango Rivière Kwango Kwango Rivier Quango
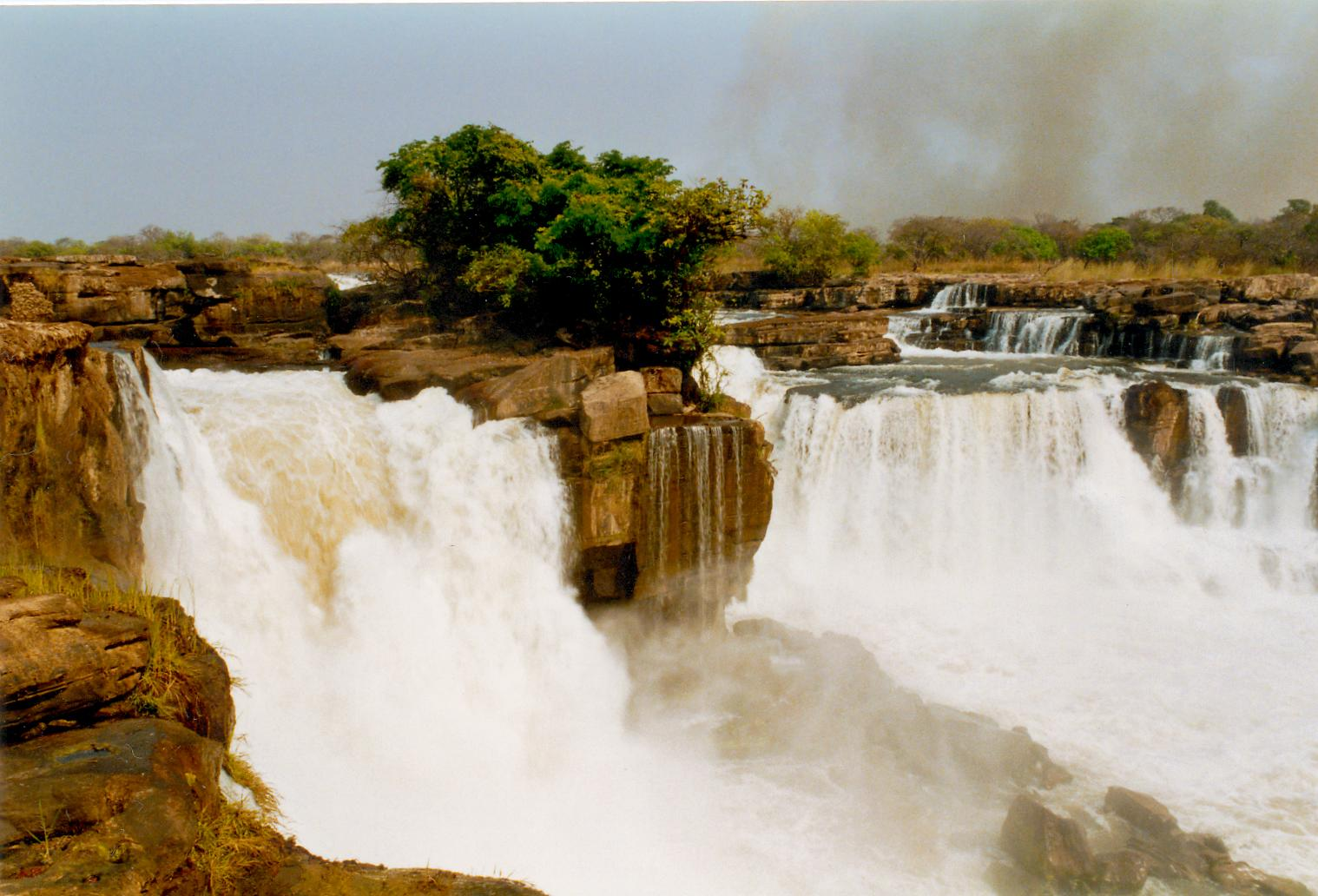
- Tazua Falls on Kwango River in Angola

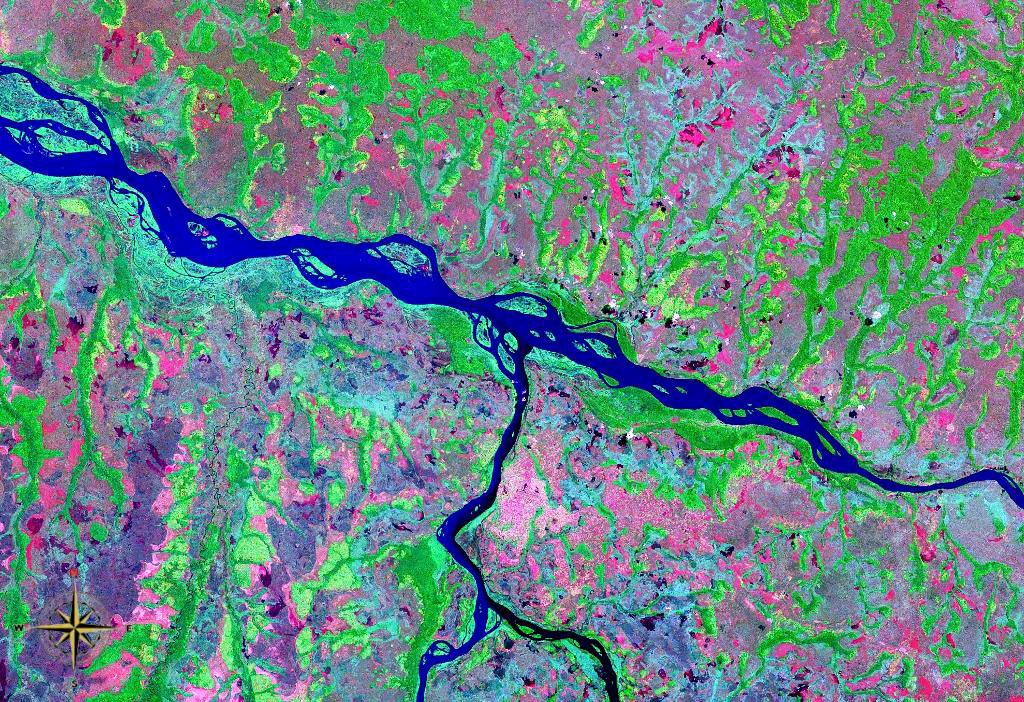
- NASA Satellite map showing Kwango River entering Kasai River

Location
- Countries: Angola; Democratic Republic of the Congo

Physical characteristics
- Source: Alto Chicapa
  - location: Angola, Angola
  - elevation: 1,647 ft (502 m)
- Mouth: At Bandundu into Kasai River in Congo River basin
  - coordinates: 3°14.666′S 17°22.416′E
- Length: 1,100 km (680 mi)
- Basin size: 263,500 km^{2} (101,700 mi^{2})
- Discharge
  - location: Bandundu
  - average: 3,299 m^{3}/s (116,500 cu ft/s)

Basin features
- River system: Cuango

The Cuango or Kwango (Portuguese: Rio Cuango; French: Rivière Kwango; Dutch: Kwango Rivier) is a transboundary river of Angola and Democratic Republic of Congo. It is the largest left bank tributary of the Kasai River in the Congo River basin. It flows through Malanje in Angola. The Kwango River basin has large resources of diamonds in the Chitamba-Lulo Kimberlite Cluster in Lunda Norte Province, discovered in the main river channel and on flats and terraces in its flood plains. In the 19th century, the Kwango River was also called the Quango, especially in the works of explorer David Livingstone.

== History ==
The Rund Kingdom, which expanded to become the Lunda Empire, encompassed territory stretching from Kwango River to the Luapula River. Its rulers partook in the slave trade. Lunda's expansion in the valley promoted a common political and cultural heritage while also promoting slave trading, accounting for the low population densities between the Kwango and Kwilu rivers.

The Portuguese colonized the Kwango River valley and usurped the Kingdom of Kasanje. The Kwango River was subject to a Portuguese treaty signing in Lisbon on 25 May 1891, and the Declaration of 24 March 1894.

Cuango, located in Lunda Norte Province within the Cuango River Valley, is considered to be "in the diamond heartland of northeastern Angola", the richest diamond area in Angola. The town played an important role during the Angolan Civil War, as both Uniao Nacional para a Independencia Total de Angola (UNITA) and government forces attempted to seize and hold the city. UNITA surrendered the town to the government on 30 September 1997, as part of the Lusaka Protocol.

== Geography ==
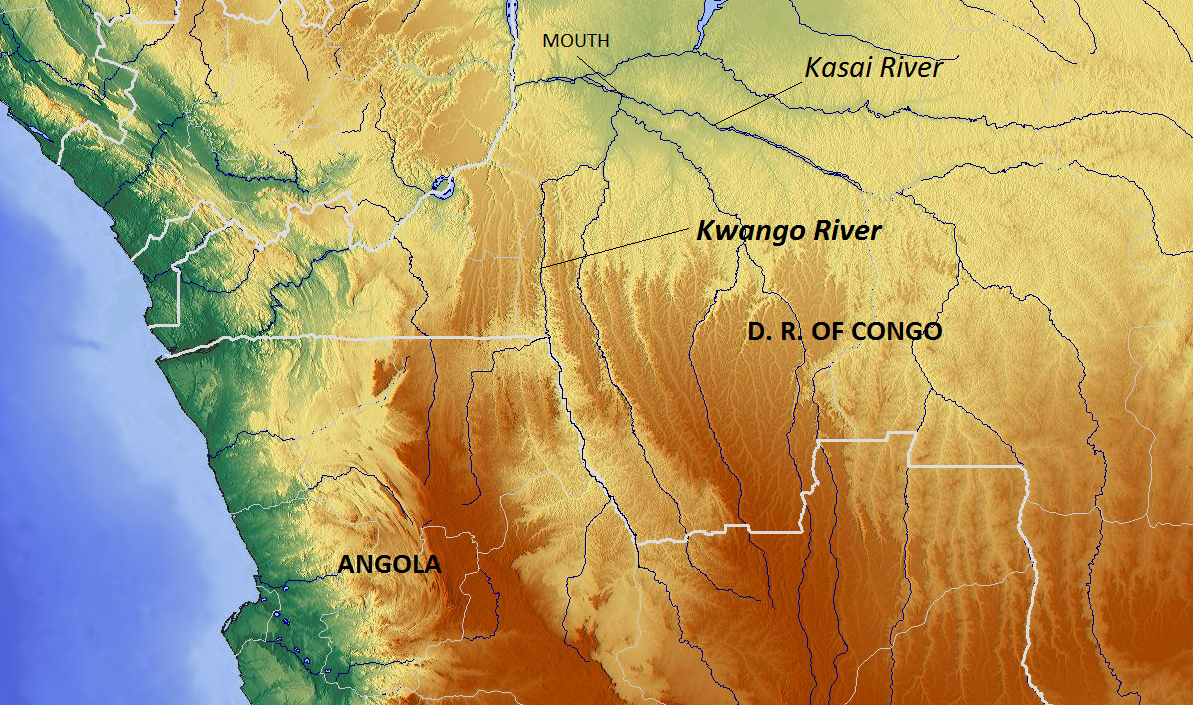
Map of Kwango River watershed.

The Cuango originates in the highlands of Alto Chicapa in the Angolan province of Lunda Sul, and flows south–north-west, crossing the border with the Democratic Republic of the Congo, and joining the Kasai River near the town of Bandundo. Thereafter, it empties into the Congo River. Rising in the Lunda plateau, the river forms a deep valley.

The Kwango River is 1,100 kilometres (680 mi) long from its source to its confluence with Congo River, of which 855 kilometres (531 mi) lies in Angola. The river drains a total catchment area of 263,500 square kilometres (101,700 sq mi). Its right bank tributaries are the Wamba and Kwilu rivers.

=== Navigation ===
The Cuango has a number of falls and rapids. Navigability is mostly achieved in the lower reaches of the river, spanning a length of 307 kilometres (191 mi) from its mouth to the Kingushi rapids. Partial navigation is also possible in the middle stretches of the river between Kingushi and the Franz Josef waterfalls over a distance of about 300 kilometres (190 mi).

=== Water resources ===
The lean season flow in the river occurs during August. The average annual discharge in the lower reaches of the river is 2,700 cubic meters per second (95,000 cu ft/s)

== Culture ==
The river valley is inhabited by the Yaka, the Suku, the Mbala, and the Pende tribal groups. Their crafting skills are seen in the form of mask carvings in geometric patterns of figurines, and other carved objects.

== Economy ==
While the river is used for fishing, the valley is developed to the extent of providing subsistence agriculture only. Of note historically is palm oil and rubber production.

The main economic activity and revenue to the Angolan State is derived by extraction of diamonds from the valley. The river basin has a rich source of diamonds in the Chitamba-Lulo Kimberlite Cluster in Lunda Norte Province, which was discovered in the main river channel and on flats and terraces in its flood plains. The provinces of Lunda Norte and Lund Sul in the river valley account for largest number of diamond mines in the valley and in Angola.

Prospecting permits have been awarded to BRC, extending to an area of 2,150 kilometres (1,340 mi) between Tembo and Kasonga Lunda over the Kwango River stretch of about 185 kilometres (115 mi). Under the mining license held by Soiadale de Desenvolvimento Mineiro (SDM), the areas of production is on the Tazua and Ginge River diversions on the Cuango.
