= Lucapa =

Town in northeastern Angola

- Municipality and town
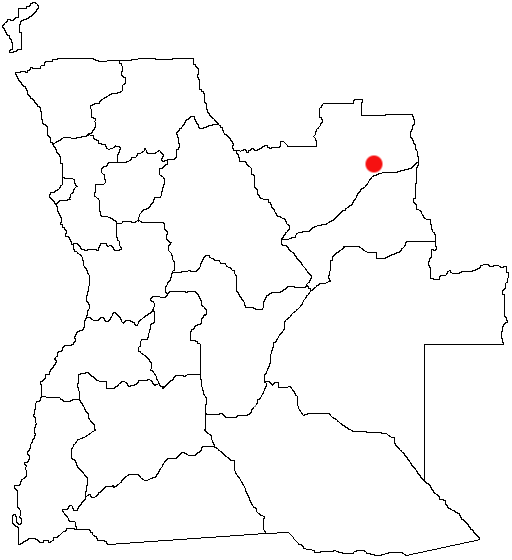
- Lucapa, Angola Location Map

- Location in Angola
- Coordinates: 8°25′22″S 20°44′21″E
- Country: Angola
- Province: Lunda Norte Province

Area
  - Total: 19,300 km^{2} (7,500 sq mi)
- Elevation: 880 m (2,890 ft)

Population (mid 2019)
  - Total: 179,020
  - Density: 9.28/km^{2} (24.0/sq mi)
- Time zone: UTC+1 (WAT)
- Climate: Aw

Lucapa is a town, with a population of 110,000 (2014 census) and a municipality with a population of 154,305 (2014 census), located in eastern Angola. Lucapa is the former capital of Lunda Norte Province.

Until the 2014 census its population was difficult to estimate as it has changed greatly over the last 15 years due to internal displacement caused by civil war and the subsequent resettlement.

== Economy ==
The primary industry in the town is mining and several thousand residents are employed by the co-operative mining group formed by SML and ITM Mining.
