= David Mendes =

Angolan lawyer, human rights activist, and politician

Manuel David Mendes (born 6 May 1962 in Cazenga, Luanda Province, Portuguese Angola) is an Angolan lawyer, human rights activist and politician. He is one of the best-known persons of the Angolan civil society, and is also known as "advocate of the poor" because of his opposition to government corruption. Among other things, Mendes directs the Angolan human rights NGO Mãos Livres (Free Hands) and due to this is sued by the Angolan government in various corruption cases.

For his work and contribution to the Angolan civil society he received the Martin Luther King Award from the US Embassy in Luanda.

Mendes is married and has seven children.
