= João Baptista Borges =

Angolan academic and politician

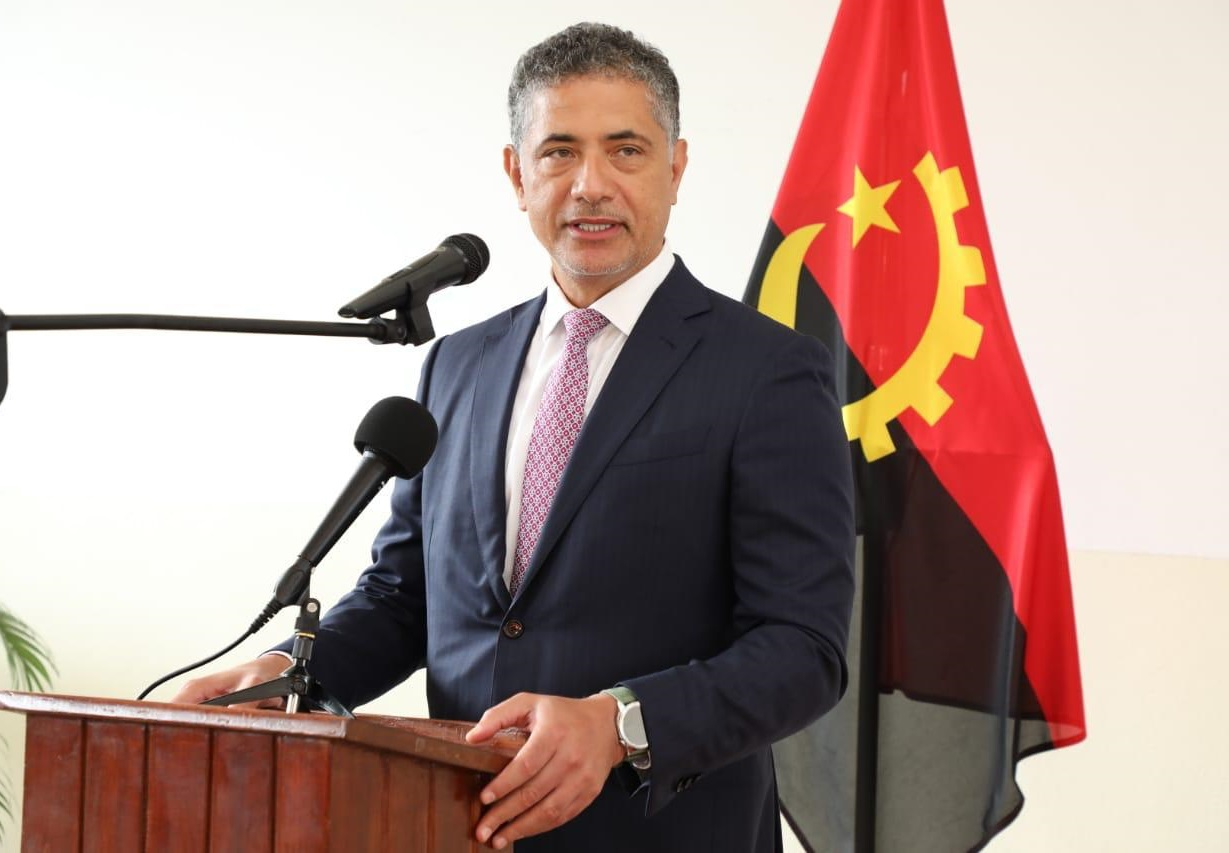
João Baptista Borges

João Baptista Borges (born 4 January 1964, Luanda) is an Angolan academic and politician who served as Minister of Energy and Water under Presidents José Eduardo dos Santos and João Lourenço from 2011 to date. He was a professor of Engineering at Agostinho Neto University and he is a member of the Political Bureau of the Popular Movement for the Liberation of Angola (MPLA) since the 17th June 1998. He speaks fluently three foreign languages, English, French and Spanish.

== Early life and education ==
João Baptista Borges was born on the 4th of January, 1964, in Ingombota, a municipality belonging to the metropolitan area of the province of Luanda. His parents are Armando Borges and Maria da Conceição de Castro Paiva.

In 1983, João Baptista Borges took an Intermediate Course in Electricity at the Makarenko Polytechnic Institute. After that, Borges studied for a bachelor’s degree in Electrical Engineering at the Agostinho Neto University in 1991, and then went for a master’s degree in Electrical and Computer Engineering Universidade Nova de Lisboa, Portugal in 2011.

== Career ==
João Baptista Borges entered the civil service in 1991 as a trainee mechanical engineer at ENE / North Regional Directorate until 1992 when he was appointed professor of Engineering at Agostinho Neto University. At the university, João Baptista Borges taught the subjects Technology of Electrical Materials I and II and simultaneously held other offices, such as: Head of the MV/LV Distribution Network Rehabilitation Project, Luanda EDEL EP, from 1991 until 1993, when he was appointed deputy general manager of the Investment Area EDEL EP, where he remained until 1999. On that position, he coordinated all EDEL's infrastructure projects, was responsible for coordinating the process of restructuring EDEL's commercial area and introducing the commercial system (Pegasus) and for coordinating EDEL's works area (execution of network extension works and connection of new clients).

In 2000 he became administrator and deputy general manager of the Technical Area EDEL EP, a position he held up until 2005. At that time, he was responsible for the preparation of the "EDEL Strategic Plan for 2002–2005", for the coordination of all EDEL's operation and maintenance activities, for the management of a wide range of activities related to the public electricity supply service, including the representation of EDEL in UPDEA (African Union of Electricity Producers and Distributors) and for agreements with other companies (EDP, LIGHT, EDF, etc.).

From 2008 to 2010, João Baptista Borges was chairman of the board of directors of EDEL, where he was responsible for its the restructuring and update of the Strategic Plan. During his management, EDEL, attracted 120,000 clients in 3 years as a result of the formalization of illegal consumers and agency (outsourcing) of services in the peripheral areas of the city of Luanda, and extended the coverage area of EDEL to the province of Bengo.

In 2008, João Baptista Borges was appointed Deputy Minister of Energy, an office he held until 2010. On that position, he was in charge of coordinating the program to strengthen the power generation capacity for Luanda (300 MW) and for coordinating the preparation of the white paper that established the Government's strategic vision for the expansion of renewable energies, among others.

From 2010 to 2011, João Baptista Borges served as Secretary of State for Energy and was responsible for coordinating the preparation of the National Energy Security Plan and he was the coordinator of the Program for Strengthening Generation Capacity throughout the country.

From 2011 to date, he serves as minister of Energy and Water. As Minister, he has been responsible for the restructuring of the state's business sector, the legal and regulatory framework of the sector and the definition of the Energy and Water Plan 2012–2017.

Minister João Baptista Borges has participated in several international events since he joined the Government. He was present at the 6th Annual Germany-Africa Energy Forum (22-25 April, 2012) in Hamburg, at the Consultative Meeting on Water Supply and Sanitation Situation, in February 2012, in Angola and Namibia, at the International Conference and International Fair on Energy and Water (24-28 September, 2012). He also participated in the High-Level Roundtable of the SADC Infrastructure Investment Summit, which took place on June 27, 2013 in Maputo, at the Meeting of SADC Ministers responsible for the Water Sector on May 30, 2013, and at the same sate at the Meeting of Ministers of ZANCOM, Standing Committee and Hydrographic Management of the Zambezi Basin. In addition, he participated in the International Conference on Hydraulic Technology in Israel (18-25 October 2013), at the International High-Level Conference on Water Cooperation held in Dushanbe/Tajikistan (20-21 August 2013) and was a member of the Angola Namibia Bilateral Commission (10-11 March 2014).

On March 10, 2023, he participated at the inauguration of the Regional Centre for Renewable Energy and Energy Efficiency (RCREEE), in the Municipality of Viana, in Luanda, whose mission is to ensure the coordination of renewable energy and energy efficiency policy of ECCAS and to promote an integrated and inclusive ECCAS market for products and services linked in the region.

He led the Angolan delegation to the UN Water Conference (22-24 March 2023) held in New York City, as Minister of Energy and Water and acted on behalf of President João Lourenço, where he announced an investment of more than USD 4 billion in the period 2023–2027 in the field of water supply, in order to solve the water situation in the country, especially in the south.

On March 17 2023, Minister João Baptista Borges also participated, on the side-lines of the UN Conference and by invitation of the World Bank Group, in the meeting of Ministers of Water and Sanitation, where he took stock of ongoing projects funded by the World Bank and referred to projects in execution, such as the Electric Sector Access and Improvement Project (ESIAP), the Water Sector Institutional Development Project (PDISA) and the Bita project.

On March 28-29, 2023, João Baptista Borges participated in the 9th Berlin Energy Transition Dialogue in Germany. He presented Angola's developments in renewable energy and mentioned the country's plan to export green hydrogen as ammonia by 2025.

At the same time, he participated in a panel discussion on "Decarbonisation of Industry – Success Stories and Challenges of the Global Hydrogen Economy".

Minister João Baptista Borges also participated at the UN Climate Change Conference 2023 (COP28) in Dubai, where he signed a concession agreement with Masdar, a renewable energy company from the United Arab Emirates (UAE), for the construction of a 150 MW solar park in the south of Angola.

As Minister of Energy of the Republic of Angola João Baptista Borges supports the 2030 Agenda for Sustainable Development Goals set by the United Nations (UN).
