= Diamang =

The Companhia de Diamantes de Angola (Diamang) was a company exploiting diamond mines in Angola. Diamang was formed on 16 October 1917 by financial investors from Angola's then colonial master Portugal, and also from Belgium, the United States, the United Kingdom and South Africa. The company was formally dissolved on 17 February 1988.

== History ==
On June 6, 1918, the mining rights of the Companhia de Pesquisa Mineira de Angola (PEMA), which was formed on 6 September 1912, were transferred to Endiama. PEMA got these mining rights on 31 March 1913. On 4 December 1920, the Portuguese High Commissioner for Angola signed a contract with Endiama, giving the company exclusive rights for diamond prospection and mining.

On 28 February 1970, Diamang and De Beers Consolidated formed the joint venture Condiama for the commercialization of diamonds.

After Angola gained independence, the major part of Endiama's capital was nationalized, by decrees 61/77 of 24 August 1977, and 255/79 of 11 December 1979. From 1978 to 1986, the British company MATS managed and serviced the operations of Diamang.

Diamond mining in Angola and Diamang's operations were severely interrupted by the Angolan civil war, where UNITA, after losing the direct support from the South African Apartheid regime, financed its operations by bartering uncut diamonds for weaponry, which was sanctioned by the United Nations Security Council Resolution 1173 and subsequent resolutions.

== See also ==
- Mining industry of Angola § Diamonds
- Forminière
