= Cafunfo =

Town in Lunda Norte, Angola

- Town
- Location within Angola
- Coordinates: 8°46′S 18°00′E
- Country: Angola
- Province: Lunda Norte

Population (2014)
  - Total: 90,000
- Time zone: UTC+1:00 (WAT)

Cafunfo is a town, with a population of 90,000 (2014), in North-Eastern Angola (Lunda Norte Province) dominated by the informal and formal diamond mining industries. The area has numerous alluvial diamond deposits.

During the 1980s and 1990s it was the subject of heavy fighting between the National Union for the Total Independence of Angola (UNITA) and the People's Armed Forces for the Liberation of Angola (FAPLA) or the Angolan Armed Forces on multiple occasions; and on at least two occasions foreign mineworkers were held hostage by UNITA during that period, including on one occasion involving a forced march to UNITA's headquarters at Jamba in the South of the country.

Despite substantial investment in infrastructure and development by the Angolan Government and the diamond companies; on each occasion that UNITA captured the town and then lost it, the rebel movement transported equipment and infrastructure to other sites before departure, leaving Cafunfo without the foundations for economic prosperity.

Formal mining did not recommence after capture by the government in the mid-1990s and the area became a stronghold for informal diamond mining.

Through the periods of tension it was only possible to reach Cafunfo by air. It is served by Cafunfo Airport.

In the early hours of February 2, 2021, the residents of the village of Cafunfo were shot while trying to carry out a peaceful demonstration. According to the police, the popular people were armed with machetes, sticks and firearms.

== Reading ==
As an archetypal diamond mining village, Cafunfo features heavily in The Perfect Soldier by Graham Hurley (Pan Macmillan, 1996).
