= Lunda Norte Province =

Province of Angola

Coordinates: 8°17′S 19°36′E

Lunda Norte
- Province
- Lunda Norte, province of Angola
- Country: Angola
- Capital: Dundo

Government
  - Governor: Filomena Elizabete Chitula Miza Aires
  - Vice-Governor for the Political, Economic and Social Sector: Frederico Inungo Barroso
  - Vice-Governor for Technical Services and Infrastructures: Domingos Dala

Area
  - Total: 103,760 km^{2} (40,060 sq mi)

Population (2014 census)
  - Total: 862,566
  - Density: 8.3131/km^{2} (21.531/sq mi)
- ISO 3166 code: AO-LNO
- HDI (2018): 0.510 low · 13th
- Website: www.lundanorte.gov.ao

Lunda Norte (English: North Lunda) is a province of Angola. It has an area of 103,760 km² and a population of 862,566. Angola's first President, Agostinho Neto, made Lucapa the provincial capital after independence, but the capital was later moved to Dundo. The province borders the Democratic Republic of Congo in the northeast and Lunda Sul in the south. The province is rich in gold and diamonds (Angola's second-largest revenue source after petroleum), but remains vastly underdeveloped and impoverished. UNITA used the money generated from the sale of diamonds to fund war efforts. Cuango River valley, the richest diamond area of Angola is located in the province. Mining is done by notable companies like DeBeers and ENDIAMA. The Lunda province whose capital was Saurimo was created by the Portuguese colonial empire on July 13, 1895. It was divided into Lunda-Sul and Lunda-Norte subdivisions through a constitution act in 1978 by the People's Movement for the Liberation of Angola (MPLA) government. Iron and manganese mining are also important economic activities. The province is well known for its sculptures. The most notable among them is The Thinker (O Pensador), a sculpture of a man holding his head. Lunda Norte is rich in diversity of flora and fauna.

Lunda Norte is populated by the Chokwe, the Lunda, and other ethnic groups. An ethnographic museum operates in the province. During the Angolan Civil War (1975–2002) many civilians were killed in the clashes between National Union for the Total Independence of Angola (UNITA) and Angolan Armed Forces (FAA). Diamond mining operations were also affected. Following the conclusion of the war, high schools were established for the first time in the province.

== Separatist movement (2007–) ==
In August 2007, President of the Republic of Angola José Eduardo dos Santos received a manifesto demanding greater autonomy for the Lundas (Lunda Norte and Lunda Sul) from a group called the Commission of the Legal-Sociological Manifesto of the Lunda Tchokwé Protectorate (Comissão do Manifesto Jurídico-Sociológico do Protectorado Lunda Tchokwé, CMJSPLT), founded and coordinated by Jota Filipe Malakito, a retired military judge specialising in criminal law. The manifesto, invoking the rights of local families and intellectuals, alleged that Portugal had bestowed international recognition on the Chokwe-ruled Protectorate of Lunda in successive agreements from 1885 onwards, then recognised Lunda's statehood in a law of 1955, but disregarded its status in the Alvor Agreement on Angola's independence of 1975; the manifesto proposed to exchange this claim to independence for administrative and financial self-rule. The presidential envoy Matias de Lemos held negotiations with Malakito in 2008, which sparked popular interest in Dundo, Lucapa and Saurimo. After the CMJSPLT had posted pro-independence flyers and flyers with Malakito's face across the Lundas, 36 arrests were made by the police in April 2009, and Malakito himself was detained in Luanda in May. The arrested CMJSPLT members, 44 in total and represented in court by David Mendes of the Free Hands (Mãos Livres) association, were charged under article 26 of the Angolan law on crimes against state security. However, an application of the law was ruled unconstitutional in the case against the Cabinda separatists in late 2010, and Mendes's petition for the release of Malakito (accused by prosecutor Celestino Paulo Benguela of receiving $600m in subsidies from the United States) and more than 30 others was also granted in March 2011.

Following his release, Malakito wrote an open letter to President Santos, demanding recognition of the alleged outcome of his 2008 negotiations with Lemos, as well as financial compensation for his detention. This provoked a split within the CMJSPLT in April 2011 between Malakito's group and the opposition led by the secretary general José Mateus "Zeca Mutchima", the spokesman Gideão dos Santos and the tribal chief Mário Katapi, who accused Malakito of collusion with the authorities and were alleged by Malakito to represent the faction that had initially advocated war against the government. In July 2011, the Movement of the Portuguese Protectorate of Lunda Chokwe (Movimento do Protetorado Português da Lunda Tchokwé, MPPLT), established by Malakito's rivals, adopted a statement of principles that contained three paragraphs (on the "fundamental rights" of liberty, freedom of contract, and private property) copied verbatim from Diogo Pacheco de Amorim's 2003 manifesto for the Portuguese right-wing party New Democracy (PND).

Zeca Mutchima emerged as the president of the MPPLT. On the occasion of the release of ten activists charged with crimes against state security in 2010 by a Luanda court in December 2013, he asserted, "The conflict is not about diamonds, it's about reclaiming national truth. We are not interested in diamond capital, we are interested in human capital. We are not Angola, we are another people". In March 2014, the representatives of the MPPLT in Europe, Mubuabua Yambissa and Chantal Alidor, met with the former Portuguese president Mário Soares and a group of Portuguese MPs in Lisbon, and the Portuguese Socialist Party Member of European Parliament Ana Gomes called for the expulsion of the Angolan ruling party MPLA from the Socialist International, an idea backed by the Angolan opposition party UNITA. Yambissa and Alidor also visited France, Belgium and Germany.

In February 2016, Malakito filed a complaint on behalf of his faction against the Angolan authorities over their conduct in the Lundas with the International Criminal Court but saw his evidence of alleged genocide challenged by the Office of the Prosecutor; he protested the ICC's handling of his case at the United Nations headquarters in New York. In March 2018, he presented a "true map of Angola" that showed the eastern half of the country as a Lunda-Chokwe state to the African Union Commission in Addis Ababa.

On 30 January 2021, the MPPLT staged an armed attack by some 300 people on the police station in Cafunfo, in which chief inspector Alfredo Hebo and at least six of the assailants died. According to the Angolan anti-corruption activist and long-time government critic Rafael Marques de Morais, the MPPLT used magic rituals, Christian prayers, and rumours about worldwide livestreaming of the event to incite the crowd. The MPPLT leader Zeca Mutchima was detained nine days later by the Serviço de Investigação Criminal on the charges of armed rebellion and criminal conspiracy, but the Office of the Attorney General failed to prosecute him for over a year citing lack of preparedness. In March 2021, the National Endowment for Democracy-funded Rafael Morais, who had just set up the UFOLO Center of Studies for a Good Governance, organised a series of meetings between victim families, local civil society, the state company ENDIAMA and the Lunda Norte governor, and launched his own investigation into the 30 January attack. His October 2021 report denied historical legitimacy to separatist claims, arguing that the Kingdom of Lunda had been terminated by the Chokwe invasion before its Portuguese colonial reconstructions, and accused both the state and the separatist movement of neglecting the social and economic development of Lunda. The MPPLT secretary general Fiel Muaco alleged that Morais had turned against the movement after being refused support from the Lunda "king" Muana Capenda Camulemba to run for Angolan presidency. Zeca Mutchima was sentenced in February 2022 to four-and-a-half years in prison, but released in February 2023 through a general amnesty law of December 2022 that applied to common criminals sentenced for up to eight years.

In February 2023, Malakito demanded "restitution" of the alleged Lunda-Chokwe state sovereignty from the President of the Assembly of the Republic of Portugal, threatening violence against Portuguese representatives and nationals. According to the Washington, D.C.-based lobbying organisation Friends of Angola, of which Morais was a director in 2021, in January 2025 Malakito, who had resided in Portugal since his release from prison, announced the intention to disband his faction (by then called Manifesto Jurídico-Sociológico do Povo Lunda, MJSLP) due to insufficient funding from members. In June 2025, the leader of the MJSLP in Angola, Jones Chivulukila, who had been arrested in June 2024, was sentenced by a court in Moxico Province to 23 years in prison on charges of high treason for advocating the creation of an independent Lunda-Chokwe state comprising the provinces of Lunda Norte, Lunda Sul, Moxico, Moxico Leste, Cuando and Cubango, and the MJSLP was outlawed.

== Municipalities ==
The province of Lunda Norte contains ten municipalities (Portuguese: municípios):

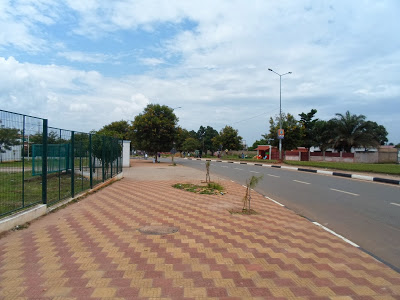
Cambulo, Lunda Norte

- Capenda-Camulemba (Capemba-Camulemba)
- Cambulo (Caumbo)
- Caungula
- Chitato (Tchitato)
- Cuango
- Cuilo
- Lóvua
- Lubalo
- Lucapa
- Xa-Muteba

== Communes ==
The province of Lunda Norte contains the following communes (Portuguese: comunas), sorted by their respective municipalities:

- Capemba-Camulemba Municipality: – Capenda-Camulemba, Xinge
- Cambulo Municipality: – Cachimo, Cambulo, Canzar, Luia
- Caungula Municipality: – Camaxilo, Caungula
- Chitato Municipality: – Dundo-Chitato, Luachimo
- Cuango Municipality: – Cuango, Luremo
- Cuilo Municipality: – Caluango, Cuilo
- Lóvua Municipality: – Lóvua
- Lubalo Municipality: – Luangue, Lubalo, Muvulege (Muvuluege)
- Lucapa Municipality: – Camissombo, Capaia, Lucapa, Xa–Cassau (Shah-Cassau)
- Xá-Muteba Municipality: – Cassanje-Calucala, Iongo, Xá-Muteba (Shah-Muteba)

== List of governors of Lunda Norte ==
Name	Years in office
João Ernesto dos Santos Liberdade	1978–1982
Silvério Gelim Paim Kubindama	1982–1986
Norberto Fernandes dos Santos Kwata Kwanawa *	1986–1992
Moisés Nele	1993–1997
Manuel Francisco Gomes Maiato	1997–2008
Ernesto Muangala	2008–2022
Deolinda Ódia Paula Satula Vilarinho	2022–2024
Filomena Elezabete Chitula Miza Aires	2024–

Up to 1991, the official name was Provincial Commissioner.
