= List of diplomatic missions of Angola =

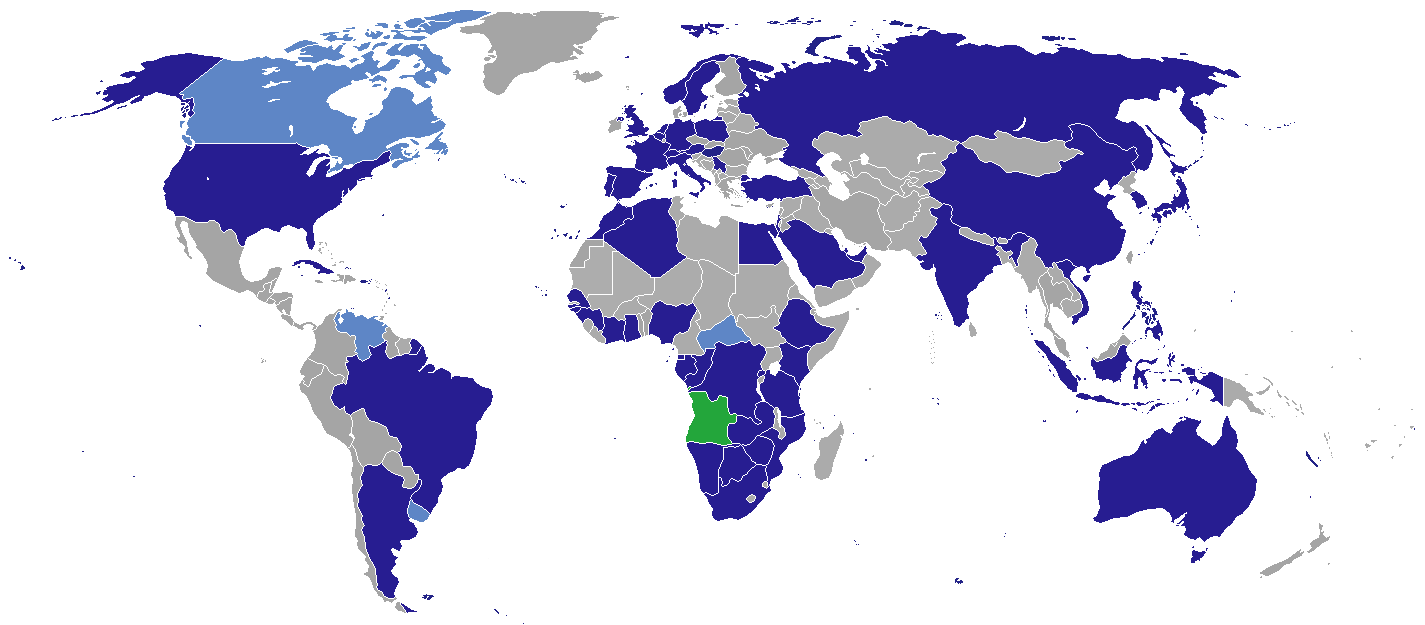
Republic of Angola Countries that host Angolan embassies Countries that host only Angolan consular missions

This is a list of diplomatic missions of Angola.

Most of Angola's diplomatic and consular missions are concentrated in neighboring countries of Central and Southern Africa, as well as in European countries that host considerable diaspora communities. Being a former possession of the Portuguese Empire for nearly 400 years - first as a colony, then as an overseas province, and finally as a federated state prior to independence in 1975 - Angola has resident missions in all member-states of the Community of Portuguese Language Countries (CPLP), as well as a permanent mission to the CPLP secretariat in Lisbon. As such, it is one of the few countries to maintain resident missions in former Portuguese colonies such as São Tomé and Príncipe, Timor-Leste, and Macau.

This listing does not include honorary consulates or trade offices.

== History ==
The Ministry of Foreign Affairs of Angola (MIREX) expanded in 2016 the country's consular network by opening consulates-general in Guangzhou, China and Mongu, Zambia.

In October 2018, MIREX closed a number of diplomatic missions, citing budget cuts as the reason. These included the embassies in Athens, Mexico City, and Ottawa; the permanent mission to the Community of Portuguese Language Countries (CPLP) in Lisbon; and consulates-general in Los Angeles, Durban, Faro, Frankfurt, and Hong Kong.

Despite these closures, MIREX slowly expanded the Angolan diplomatic network by opening embassies in Riyadh, Saudi Arabia, in 2021; in Dakar, Senegal; in 2022; and in Doha, Qatar, in 2023. Consulates-general were also opened in Istanbul, Turkey, and in Toronto, Canada, in 2023. At some point, the permanent mission to the CPLP was also reopened.

In July 2024, MIREX announced the opening of four embassies, in Canberra, Australia; Dili, Timor-Leste; Jakarta, Indonesia; and Oslo, Norway. On the other hand, MIREX announced the closure of the embassy in Singapore, and the transfer of its ambassador to the embassy in Manila, Philippines, which had heretofore been led by a chargé d'affaires.

== Current missions ==
=== Africa ===
Host country	Host city	Mission	Concurrent accreditation	Ref.
Algeria	Algiers	Embassy	Countries: Libya; Sahrawi Republic; Tunisia	
Botswana	Gaborone	Embassy	International Organizations: Southern African Development Community	
Cape Verde	Praia	Embassy		
Central African Republic	Bangui	Consulate-General (Note: Subordinate to the embassy in Brazzaville.)		
Congo-Brazzaville	Brazzaville	Embassy	Countries: Central African Republic	
Congo-Brazzaville	Dolisie	Consulate-General	Countries: Central African Republic	
Congo-Brazzaville	Pointe-Noire	Consulate-General	Countries: Central African Republic	
Congo-Kinshasa	Kinshasa	Embassy		
Congo-Kinshasa	Lubumbashi	Consulate-General		
Congo-Kinshasa	Matadi	Consulate-General		
Egypt	Cairo	Embassy	Countries: Jordan; Lebanon; Palestine; Yemen	
Ethiopia	Addis Ababa	Embassy	Countries: Djibouti; Eritrea; Sudan; International Organizations: African Union; United Nations Economic Commission for Africa	
Equatorial Guinea	Malabo	Embassy	Countries: Cameroon; Chad	
Gabon	Libreville	Embassy		
Ghana	Accra	Embassy	Countries: Togo	
Guinea	Conakry	Embassy		
Guinea-Bissau	Bissau	Embassy		
Ivory Coast	Abidjan	Embassy	Countries: Burkina Faso; Mali	
Kenya	Nairobi	Embassy	Countries: Somalia; South Sudan; Uganda; International Organizations: United Nations; United Nations Environment Programme; United Nations Human Settlements Programme	
Morocco	Rabat	Embassy		
Mozambique	Maputo	Embassy	Countries: Eswatini	
Namibia	Windhoek	Embassy		
Namibia	Oshakati	Consulate-General		
Namibia	Rundu	Consulate-General		
Nigeria	Abuja	Embassy	Countries: Benin; Niger; International Organizations: Economic Community of West African States	
Rwanda	Kigali	Embassy		
São Tomé and Príncipe	São Tomé	Embassy		
Senegal	Dakar	Embassy	Countries: Gambia; Mauritania	
South Africa	Pretoria	Embassy	Countries: Lesotho; Madagascar	
South Africa	Cape Town	Consulate-General	Countries: Lesotho; Madagascar	
South Africa	Johannesburg	Consulate-General	Countries: Lesotho; Madagascar	
Tanzania	Dar-Es-Salaam	Embassy	Countries: Burundi; Comoros; Mauritius; Seychelles	
Uganda	Kampala	Liaison office (Note: Subordinate to the embassy in Nairobi.)		
Zambia	Lusaka	Embassy	Countries: Malawi	
Zambia	Mongu	Consulate-General	Countries: Malawi	
Zambia	Solwezi	Consulate-General	Countries: Malawi	
Zimbabwe	Harare	Embassy		

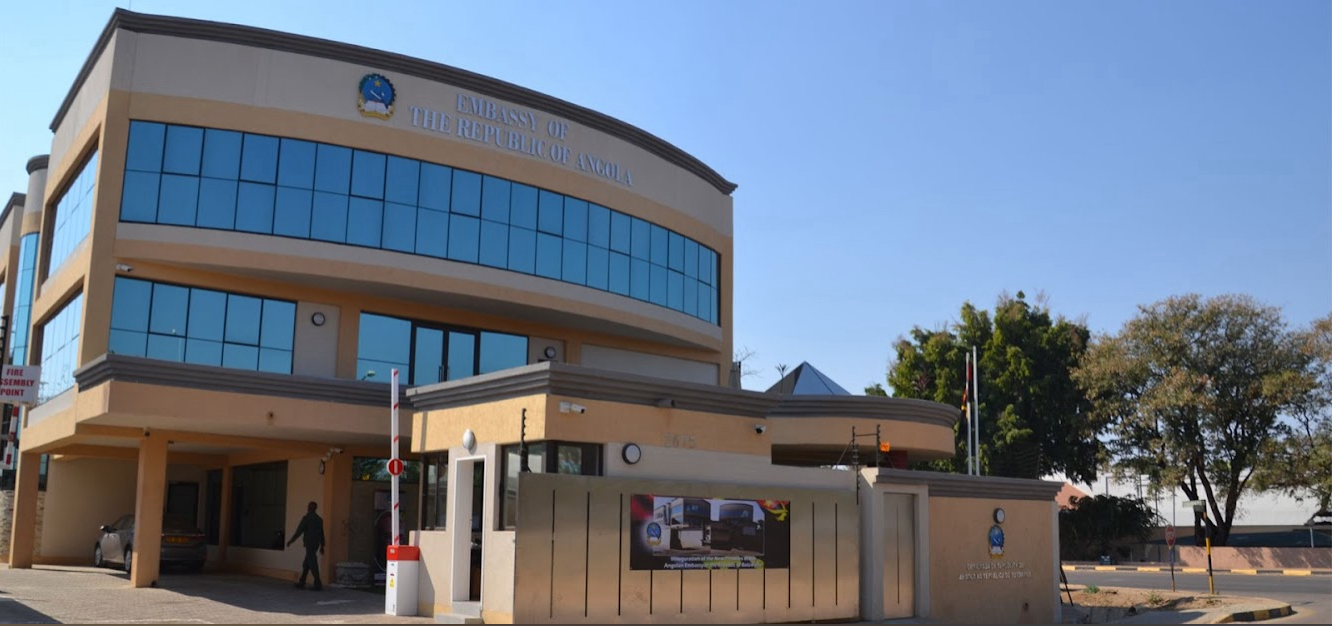
Embassy in Gaborone

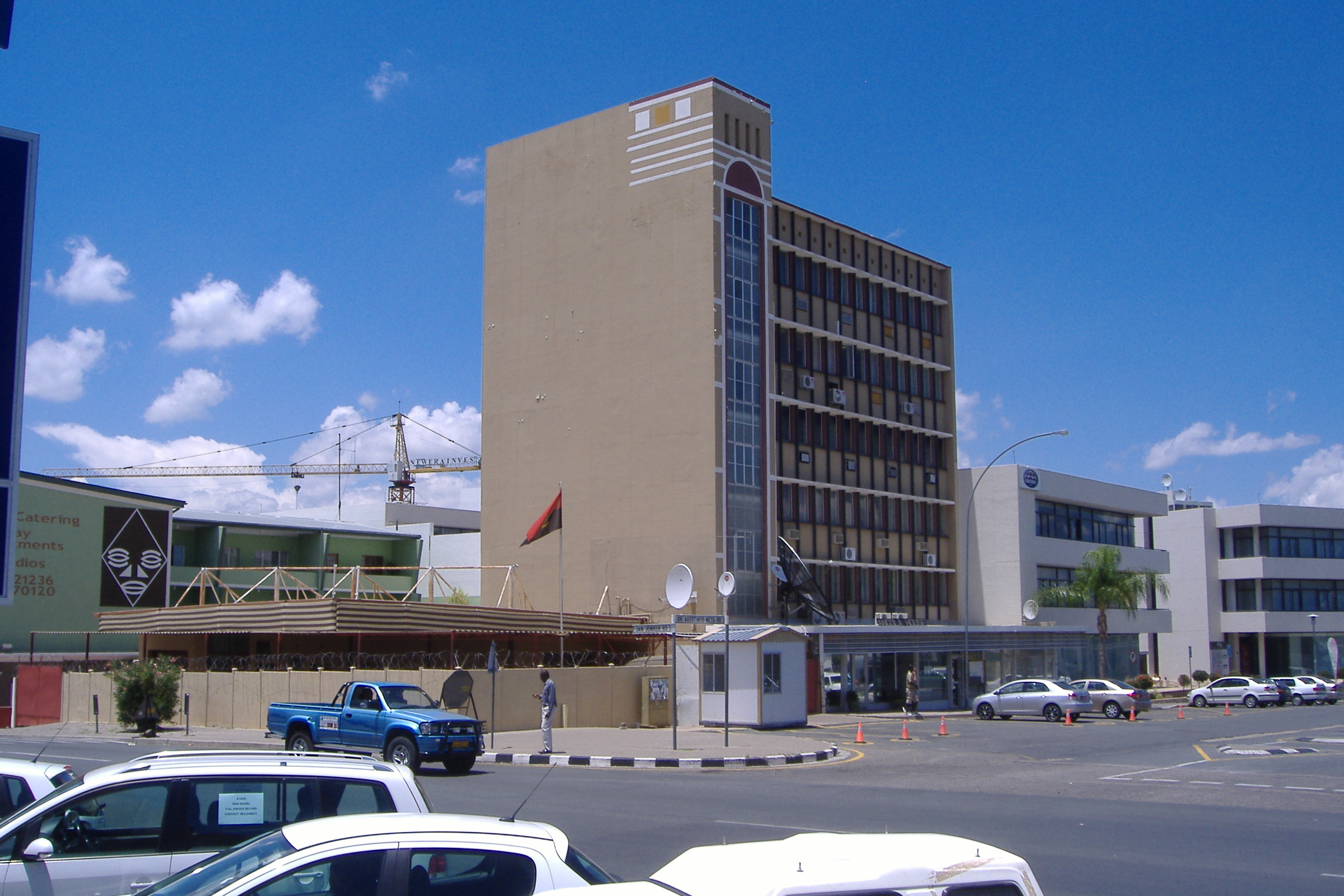
Embassy in Windhoek

=== Americas ===
Host country	Host city	Mission	Concurrent accreditation	Ref.
Argentina	Buenos Aires	Embassy	Countries: Bolivia; Chile; Ecuador; Paraguay; Uruguay	
Brazil	Brasília	Embassy	Countries: Colombia; Guyana; Peru; Suriname; Venezuela	
Brazil	Rio de Janeiro	Consulate-General	Countries: Colombia; Guyana; Peru; Suriname; Venezuela	
Brazil	São Paulo	Consulate-General	Countries: Colombia; Guyana; Peru; Suriname; Venezuela	
Canada	Toronto	Consulate-General (Note: Subordinate to the embassy in Washington, D.C.)		
Cuba	Havana	Embassy	Countries: Costa Rica; Dominican Republic; El Salvador; Guatemala; Haiti; Honduras; Nicaragua; Panama	
United States	Washington, D.C.	Embassy	Countries: Antigua and Barbuda; Barbados; Belize; Canada; Dominica; Grenada; Jamaica; Mexico; Saint Kitts and Nevis; Saint Vincent and the Grenadines; Trinidad and Tobago; International Organizations: International Civil Aviation Organization; Organization of American States (Note: Accredited as an observer mission.)	
United States	Houston	Consulate-General	Countries: Antigua and Barbuda; Barbados; Belize; Canada; Dominica; Grenada; Jamaica; Mexico; Saint Kitts and Nevis; Saint Vincent and the Grenadines; Trinidad and Tobago; International Organizations: International Civil Aviation Organization; Organization of American States	
United States	New York City	Consulate-General	Countries: Antigua and Barbuda; Barbados; Belize; Canada; Dominica; Grenada; Jamaica; Mexico; Saint Kitts and Nevis; Saint Vincent and the Grenadines; Trinidad and Tobago; International Organizations: International Civil Aviation Organization; Organization of American States	
Uruguay	Montevideo	Consulate-General (Note: Subordinate to the embassy in Buenos Aires.)		
Venezuela	Caracas	Consulate-General (Note: Subordinate to the embassy in Brasília.)		

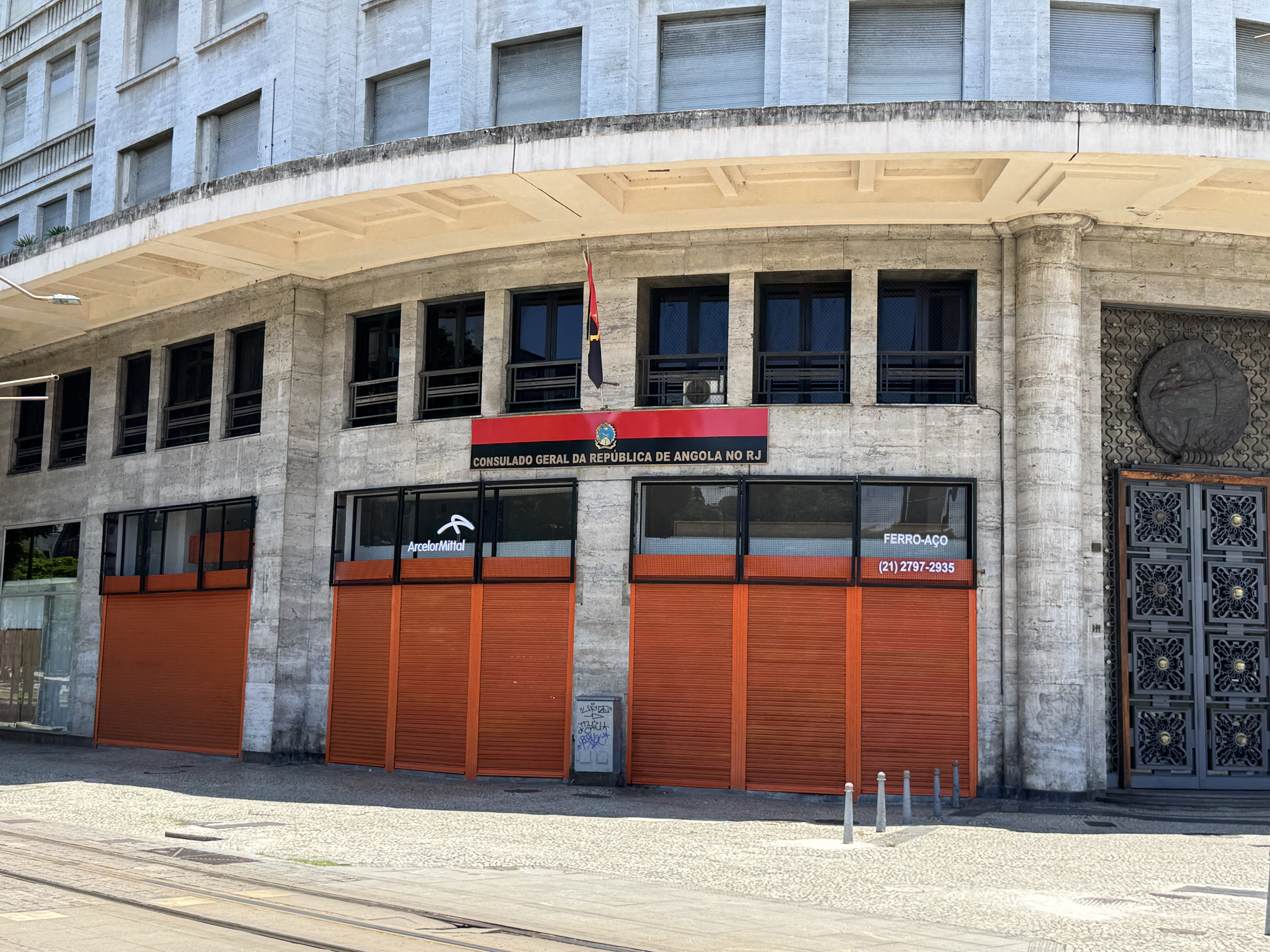
Consulate-General in Rio de Janeiro

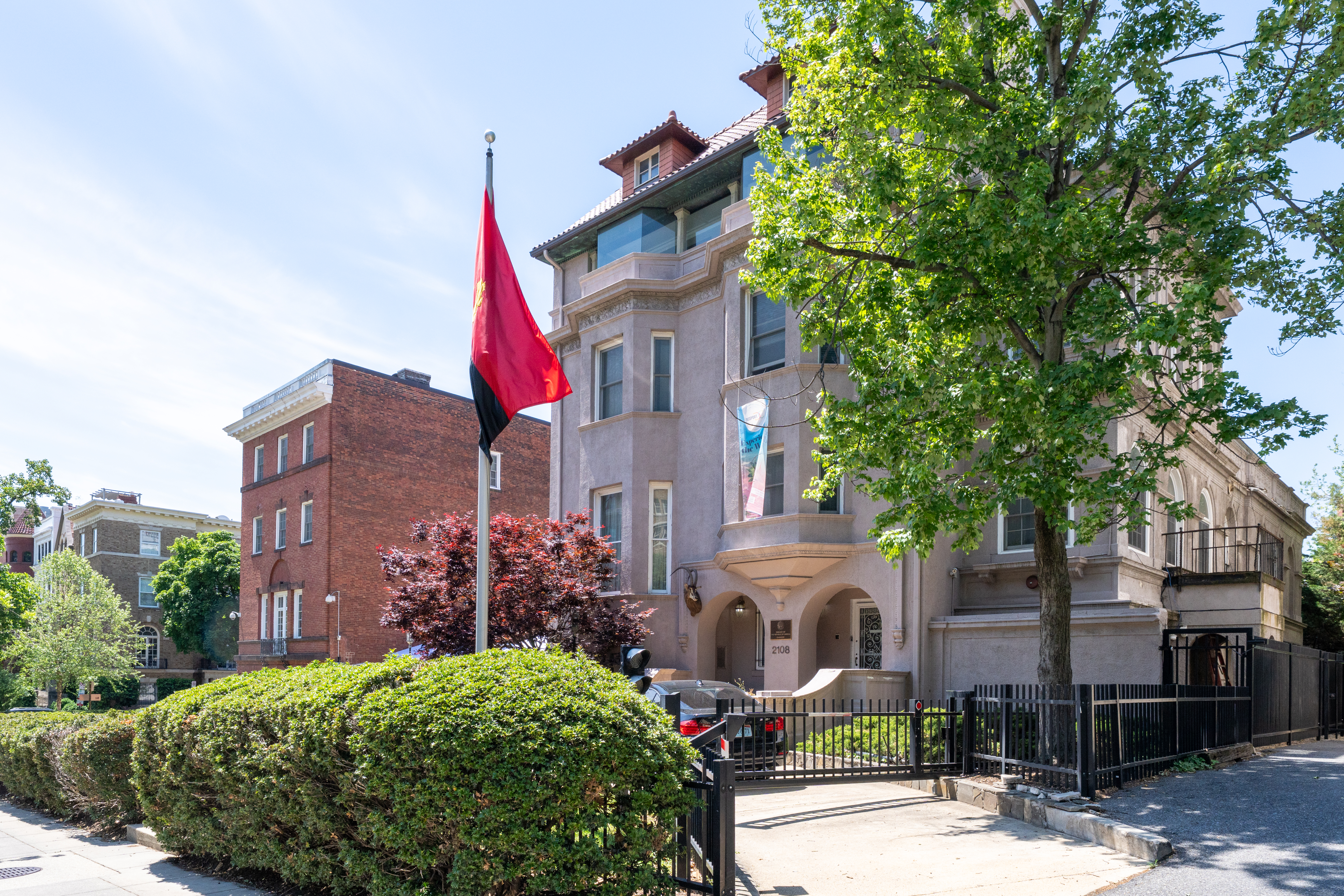
Embassy in Washington, D.C.

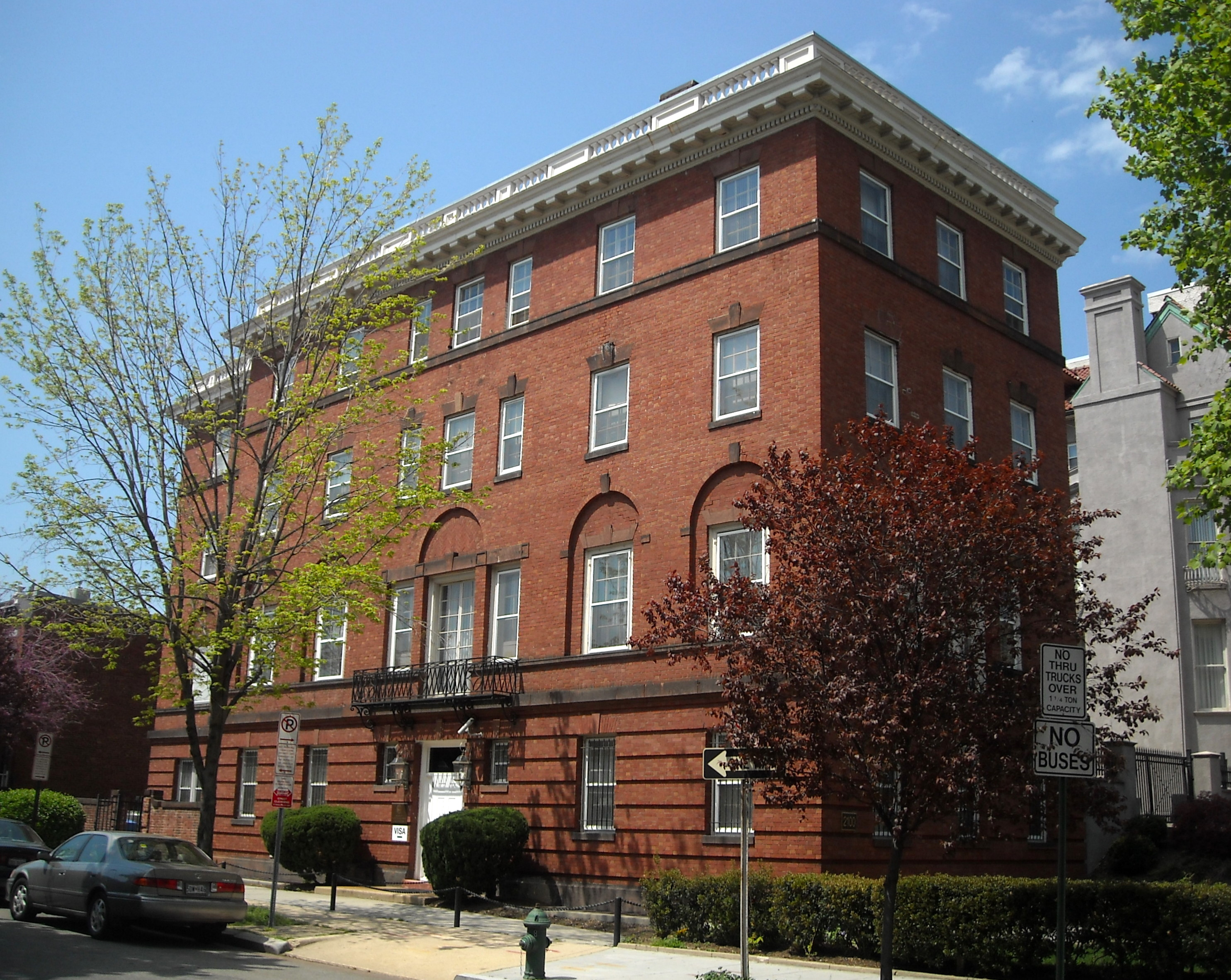
Embassy in Washington, D.C. (Consular section)

=== Asia ===
Host country	Host city	Mission	Concurrent accreditation	Ref.
China	Beijing	Embassy	Countries: North Korea	
China	Guangzhou	Consulate-General	Countries: North Korea	
China	Macau	Consulate-General	Countries: North Korea	
India	New Delhi	Embassy	Countries: Bangladesh; Maldives; Nepal; Sri Lanka	
Indonesia	Jakarta	Embassy	Countries: Brunei	
Israel	Tel Aviv	Embassy		
Japan	Tokyo	Embassy		
Philippines	Manila	Embassy		
Qatar	Doha	Embassy		
Saudi Arabia	Riyadh	Embassy	Countries: Oman	
South Korea	Seoul	Embassy		
Timor-Leste	Dili	Embassy		
Turkey	Ankara	Embassy	Countries: Georgia; Iran; Iraq	
Turkey	Istanbul	Consulate-General	Countries: Georgia; Iran; Iraq	
United Arab Emirates	Abu Dhabi	Embassy	Countries: Afghanistan; Bahrain; Kuwait; Pakistan; International Organizations: International Renewable Energy Agency	
United Arab Emirates	Dubai	Consulate-General	Countries: Afghanistan; Bahrain; Kuwait; Pakistan; International Organizations: International Renewable Energy Agency	
Vietnam	Hanoi	Embassy	Countries: Cambodia; Laos; Malaysia; Myanmar; Thailand	

Building hosting the Embassy in Manila

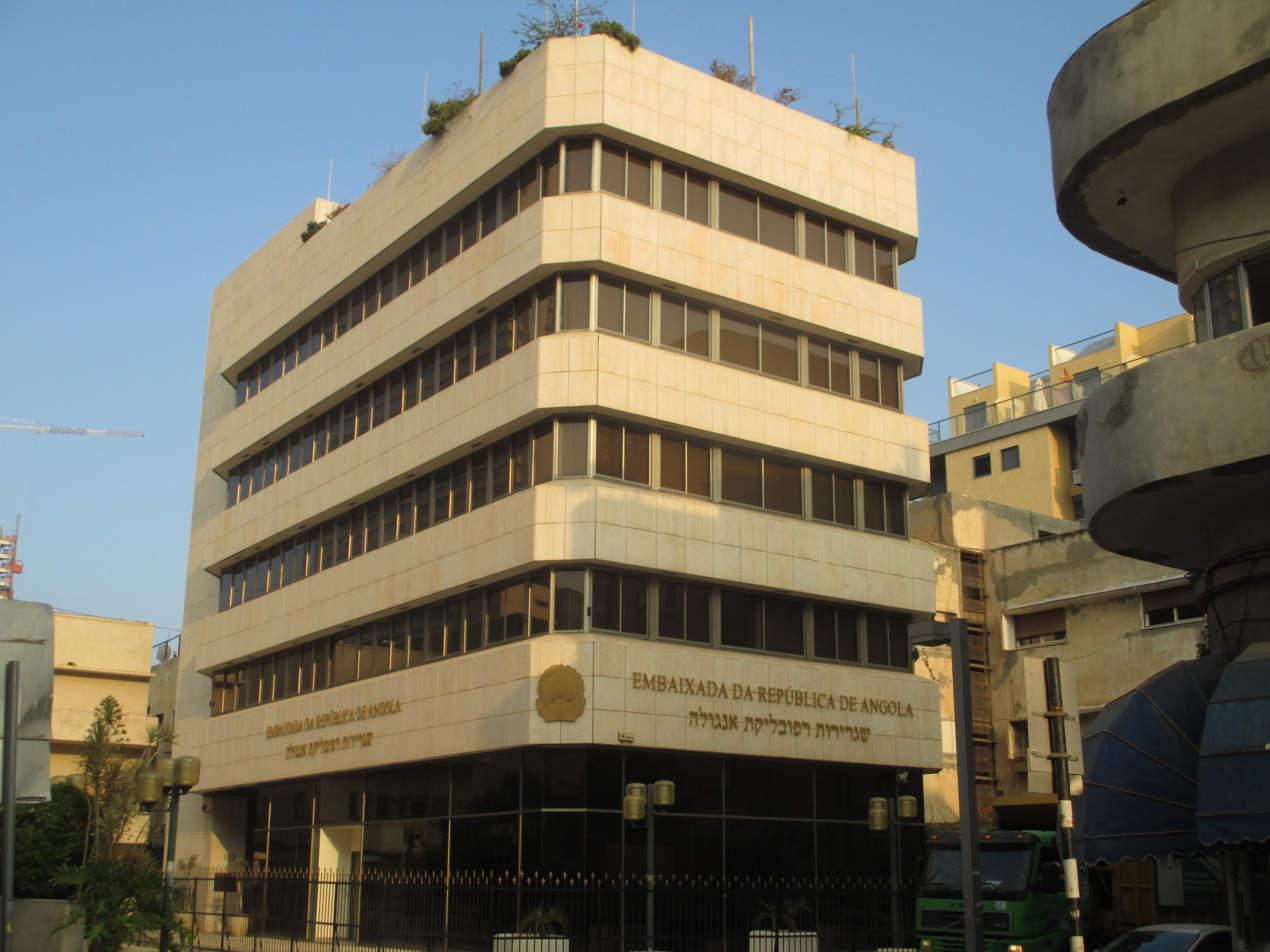
Embassy in Tel Aviv

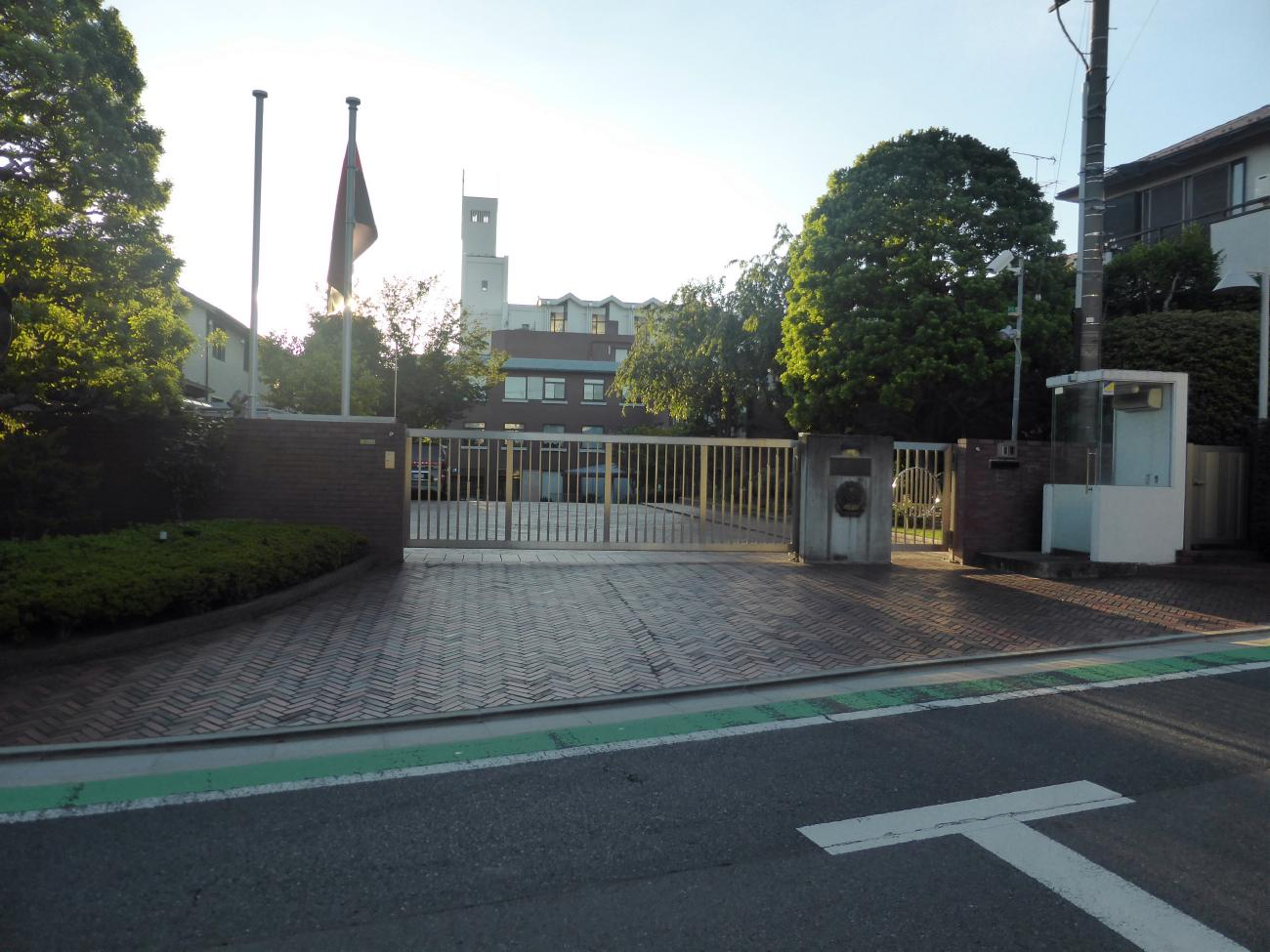
Embassy in Tokyo

=== Europe ===
Host country	Host city	Mission	Concurrent accreditation	Ref.
Austria	Vienna	Embassy	Countries: Croatia; Slovakia; Slovenia; International Organizations: United Nations; International Atomic Energy Agency; UNIDO; UNODC; UNCITRAL	
Belgium	Brussels	Embassy	Countries: Luxembourg; International Organizations: European Union	
France	Paris	Embassy	Countries: Monaco	
Germany	Berlin	Embassy	Countries: Czechia	
Holy See (Note: The Angolan Embassy to the Holy See is located outside Vatican territory, in Rome.)	Rome	Embassy	Sovereign Entity: Sovereign Military Order of Malta	
Hungary	Budapest	Embassy	Countries: Bosnia and Herzegovina; North Macedonia	
Italy	Rome	Embassy	Countries: Albania; Cyprus; Greece; Malta; San Marino; International Organizations: Food and Agriculture Organization; International Fund for Agricultural Development; World Food Programme	
Netherlands	The Hague	Embassy	International Organizations: Organisation for the Prohibition of Chemical Weapons	
Netherlands	Rotterdam	Consulate-General	International Organizations: Organisation for the Prohibition of Chemical Weapons	
Norway	Oslo	Embassy		
Poland	Warsaw	Embassy	Countries: Estonia; Latvia; Lithuania; Ukraine	
Portugal	Lisbon	Embassy		
Portugal	Porto	Consulate-General		
Russia	Moscow	Embassy	Countries: Armenia; Azerbaijan; Belarus; Kazakhstan; Kyrgyzstan; Moldova; Mongolia; Tajikistan; Turkmenistan; Uzbekistan	
Serbia	Belgrade	Embassy	Countries: Bulgaria; Montenegro; Romania	
Spain	Madrid	Embassy	Countries: Andorra; Multilateral Organizations: UN Tourism	
Sweden	Stockholm	Embassy	Countries: Denmark; Finland; Iceland	
Switzerland	Bern	Embassy	Countries: Liechtenstein	
United Kingdom	London	Embassy	Countries: Ireland; International Organizations: International Maritime Organization; International Coffee Organization; International Sugar Organization	

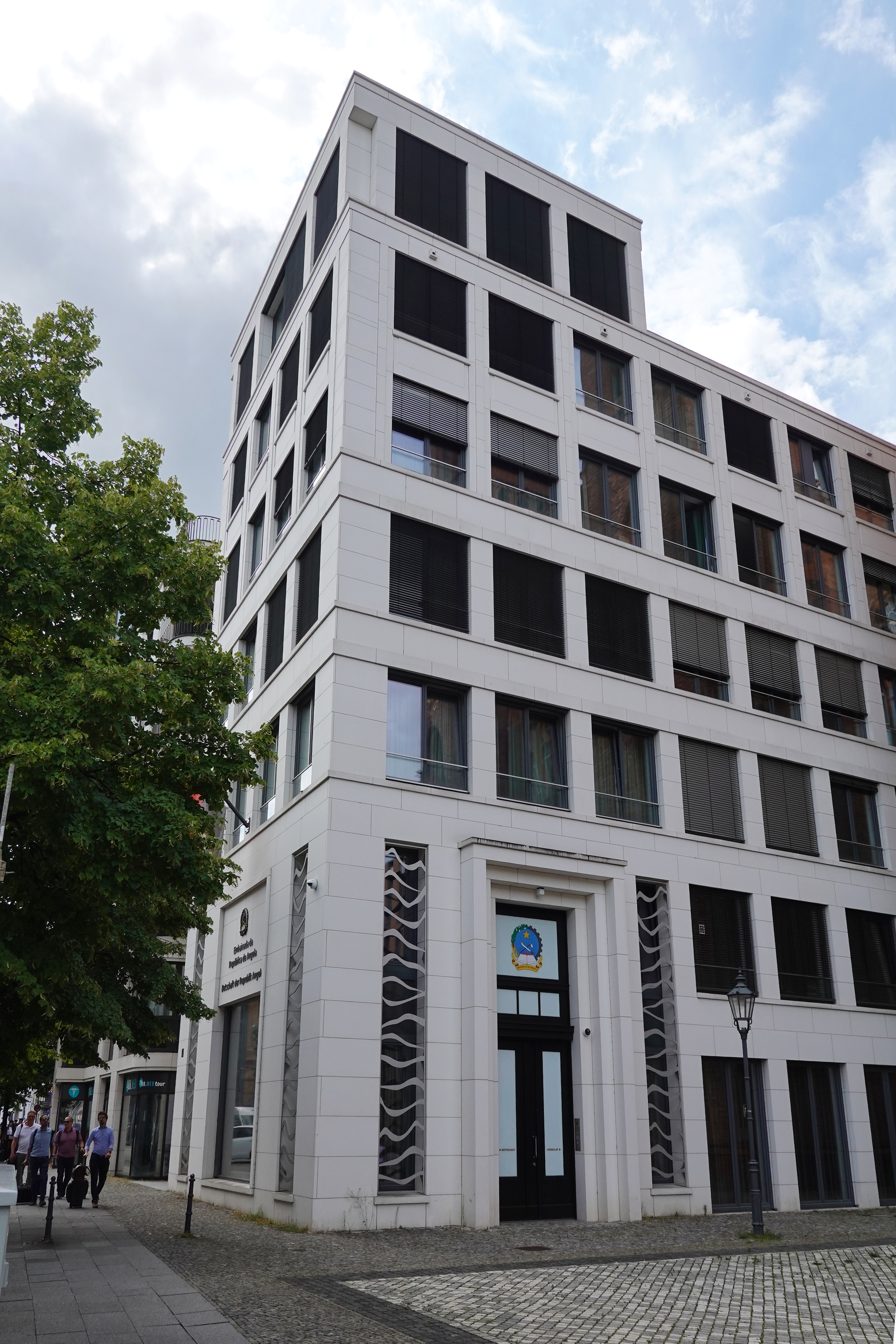
Embassy in Berlin

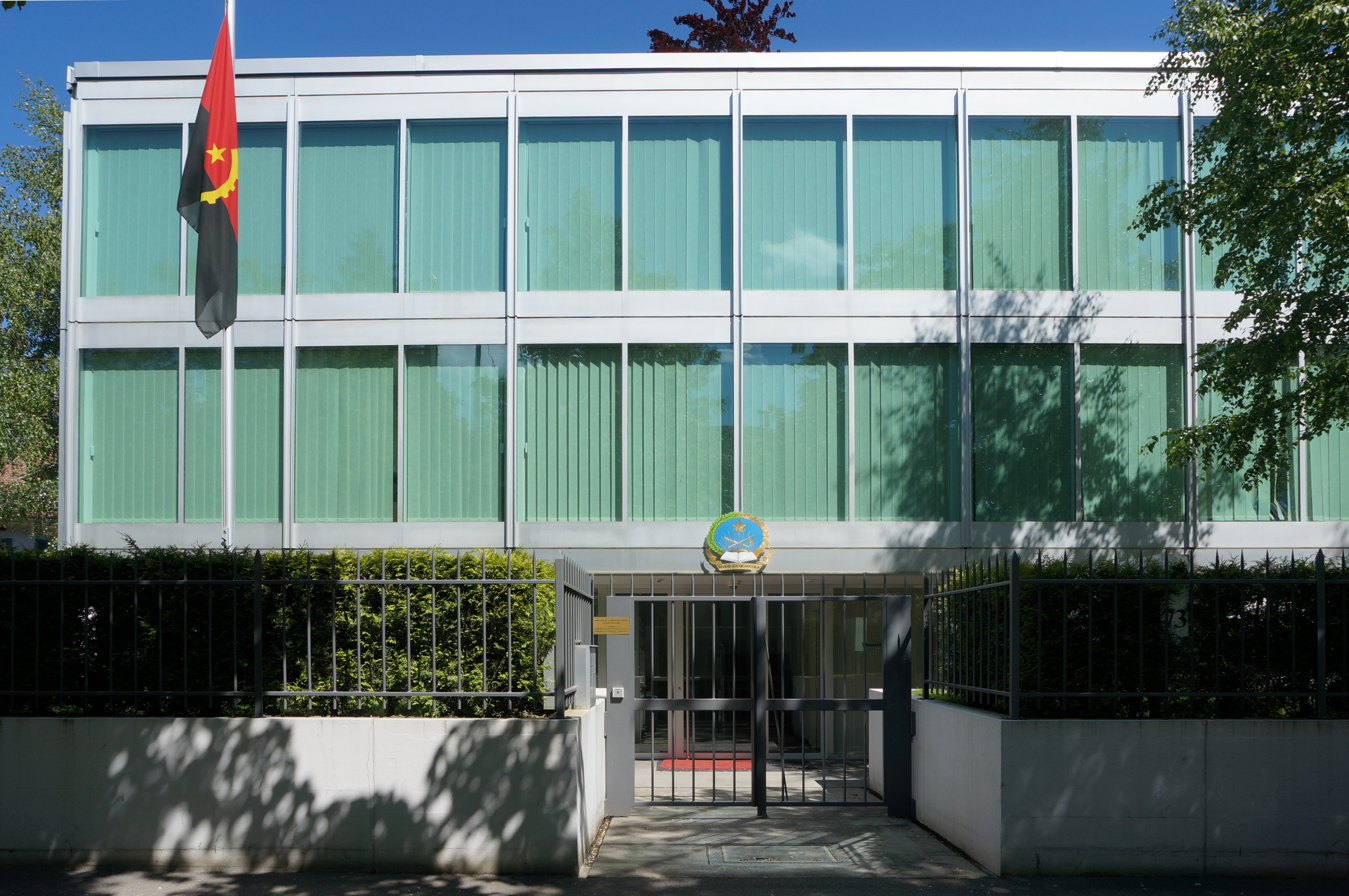
Embassy in Bern

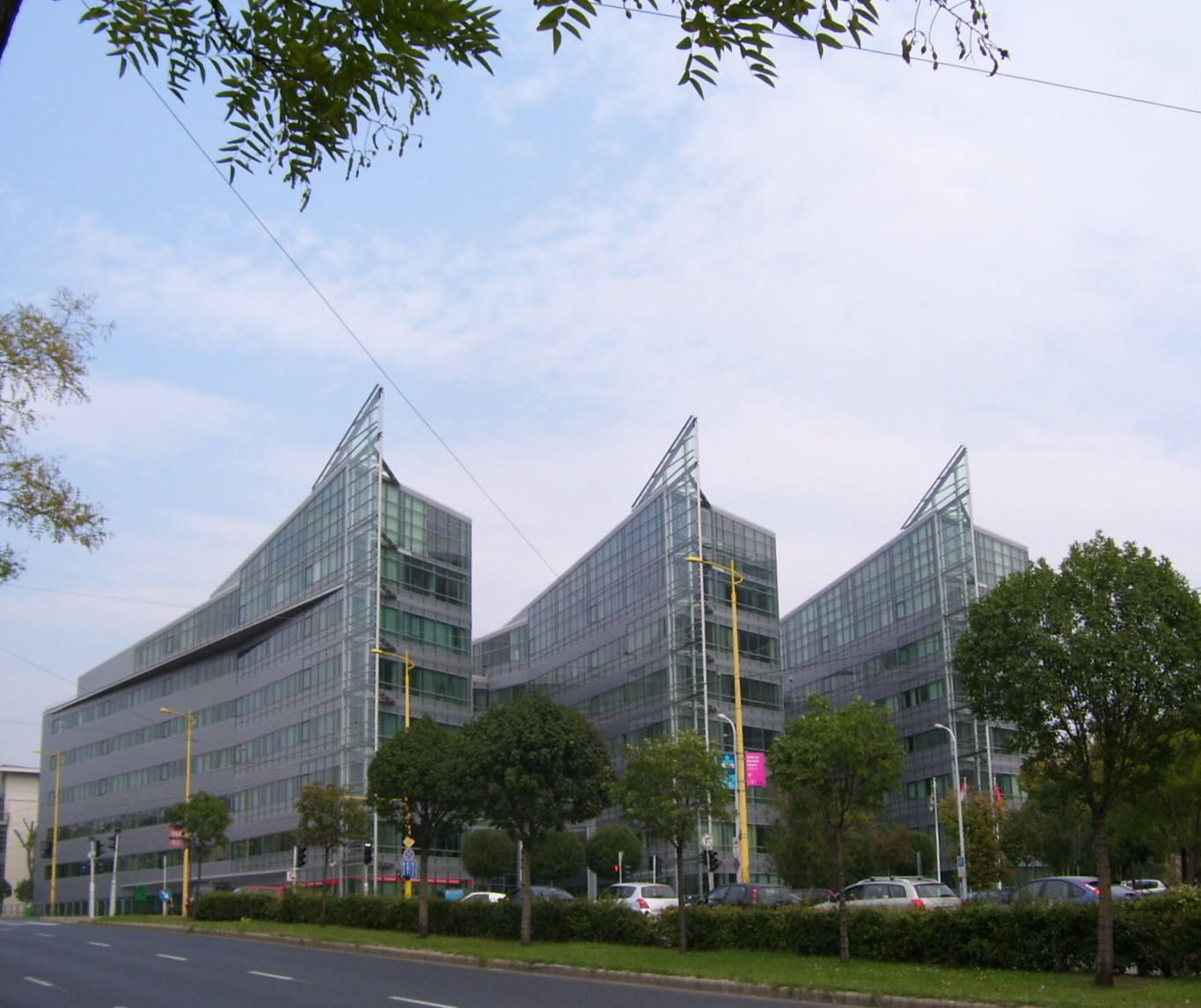
Building hosting the Embassy in Budapest

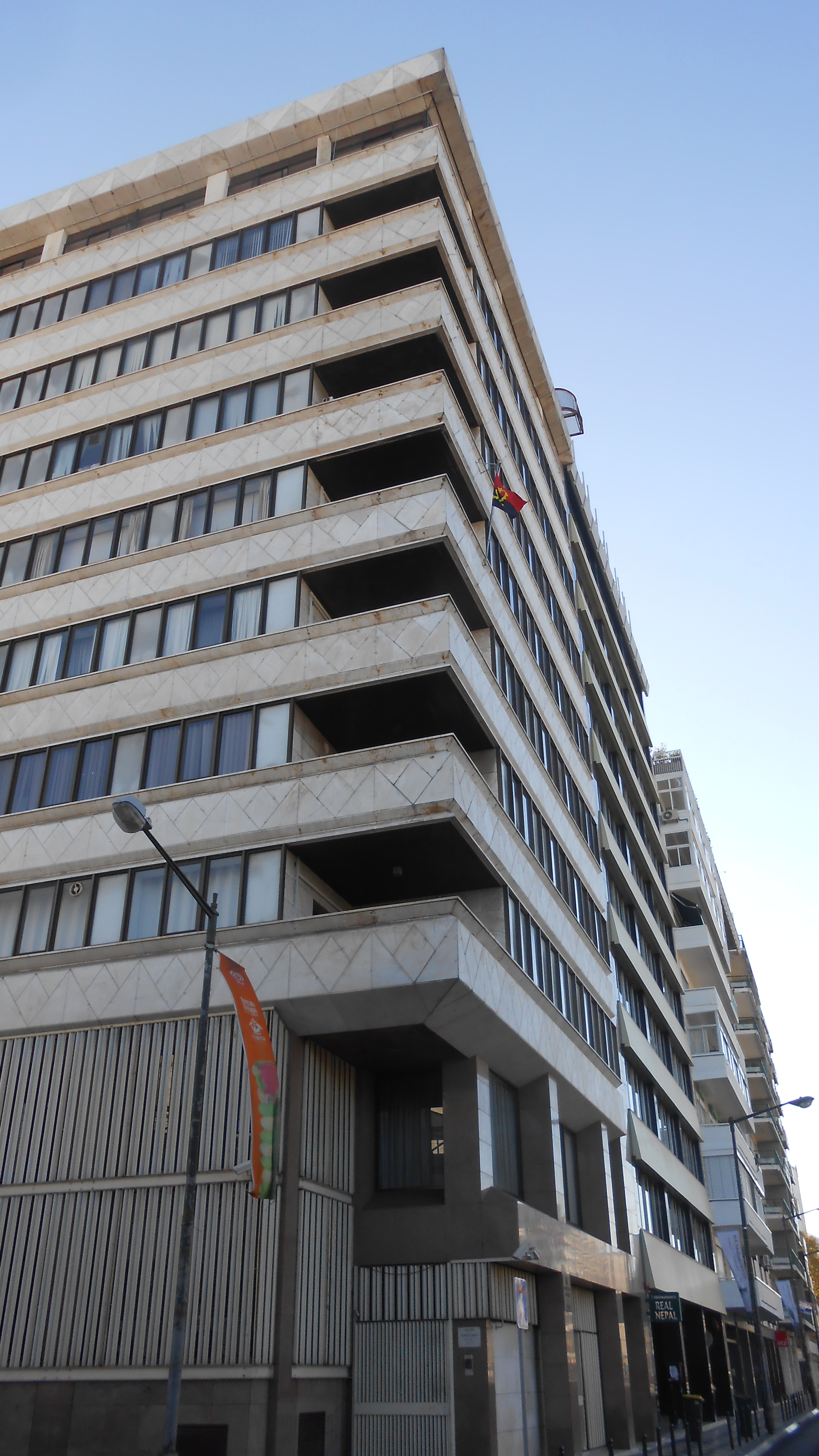
Embassy in Lisbon

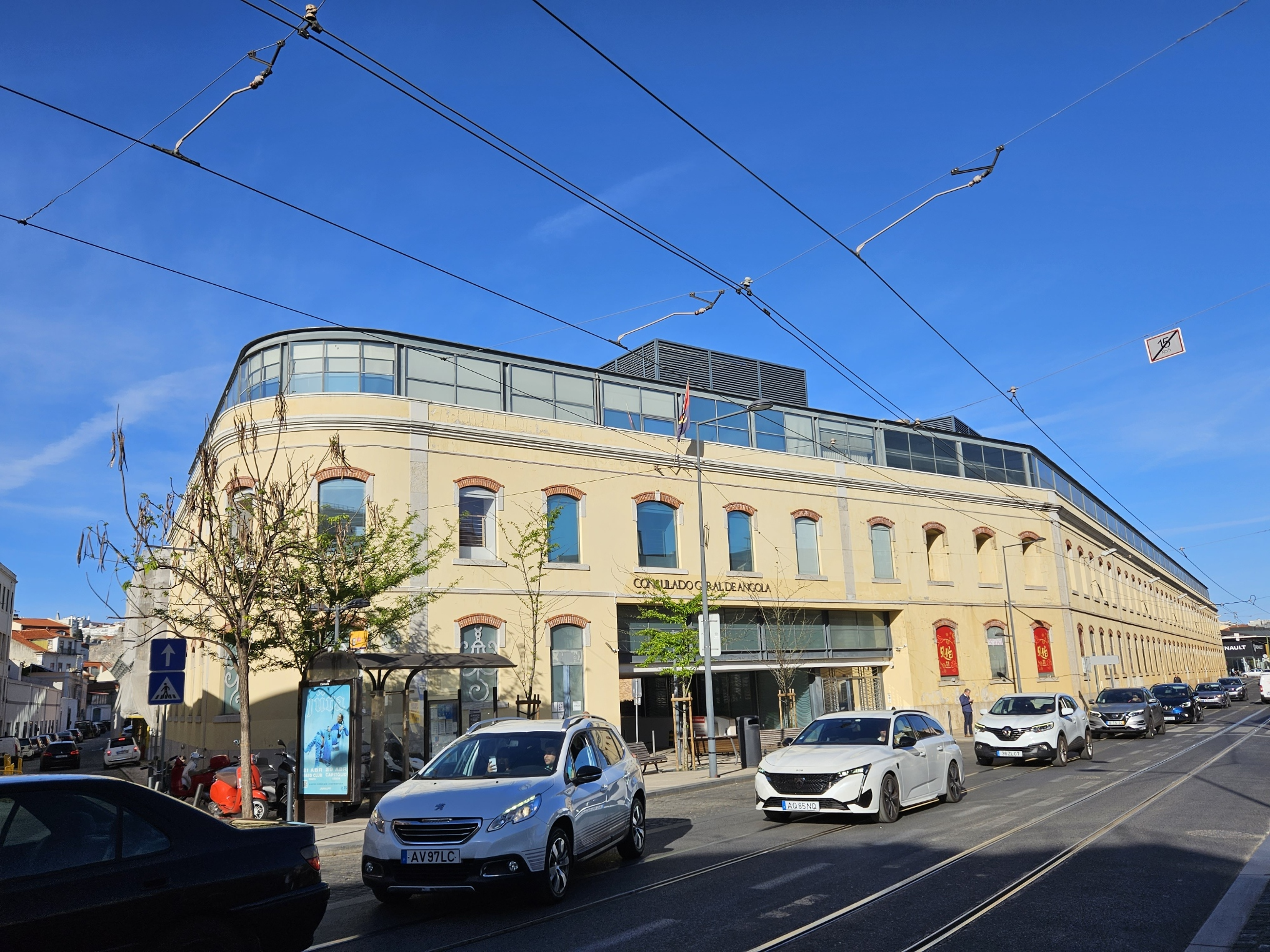
Consulate-General in Lisbon

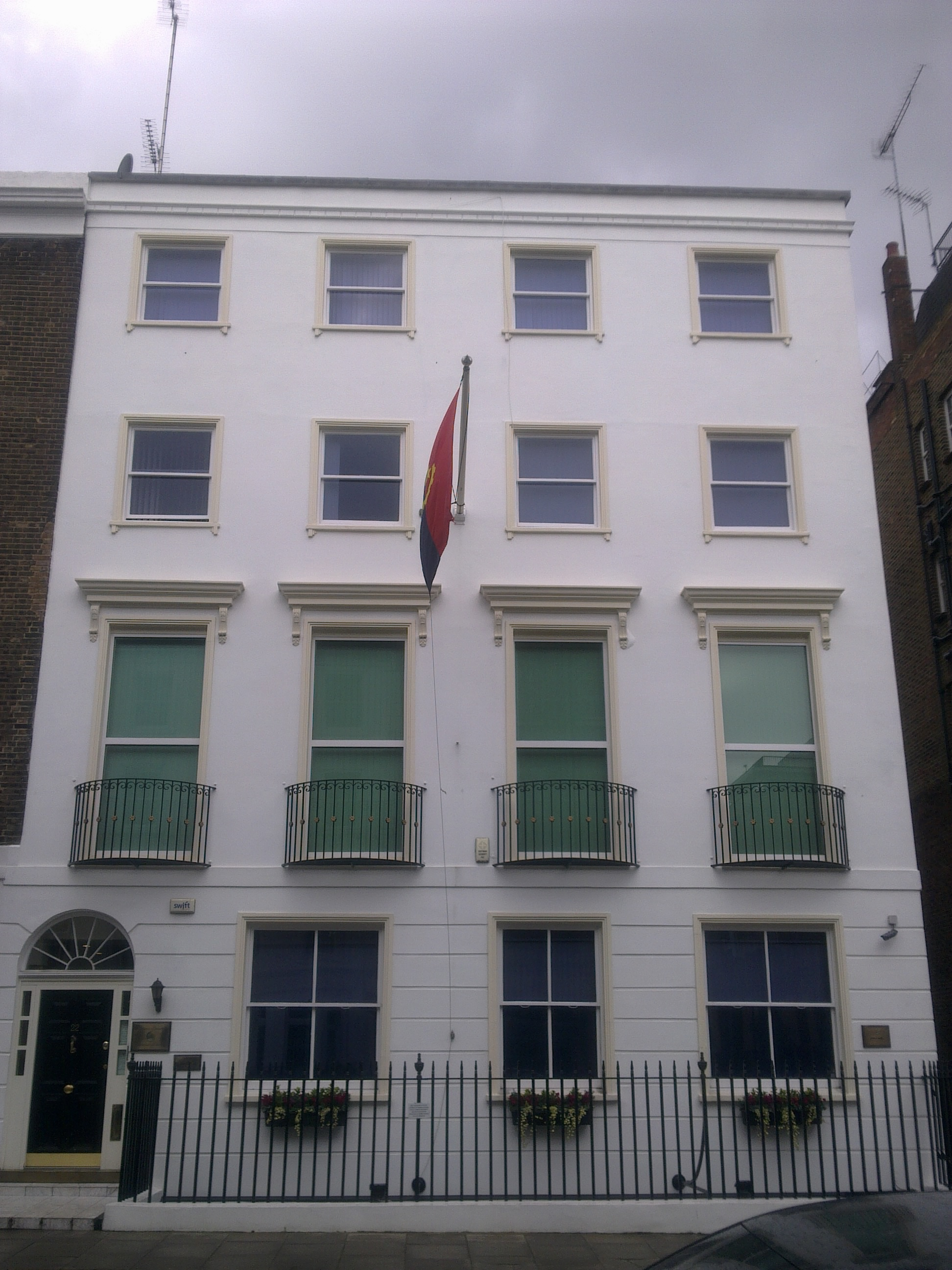
Embassy in London

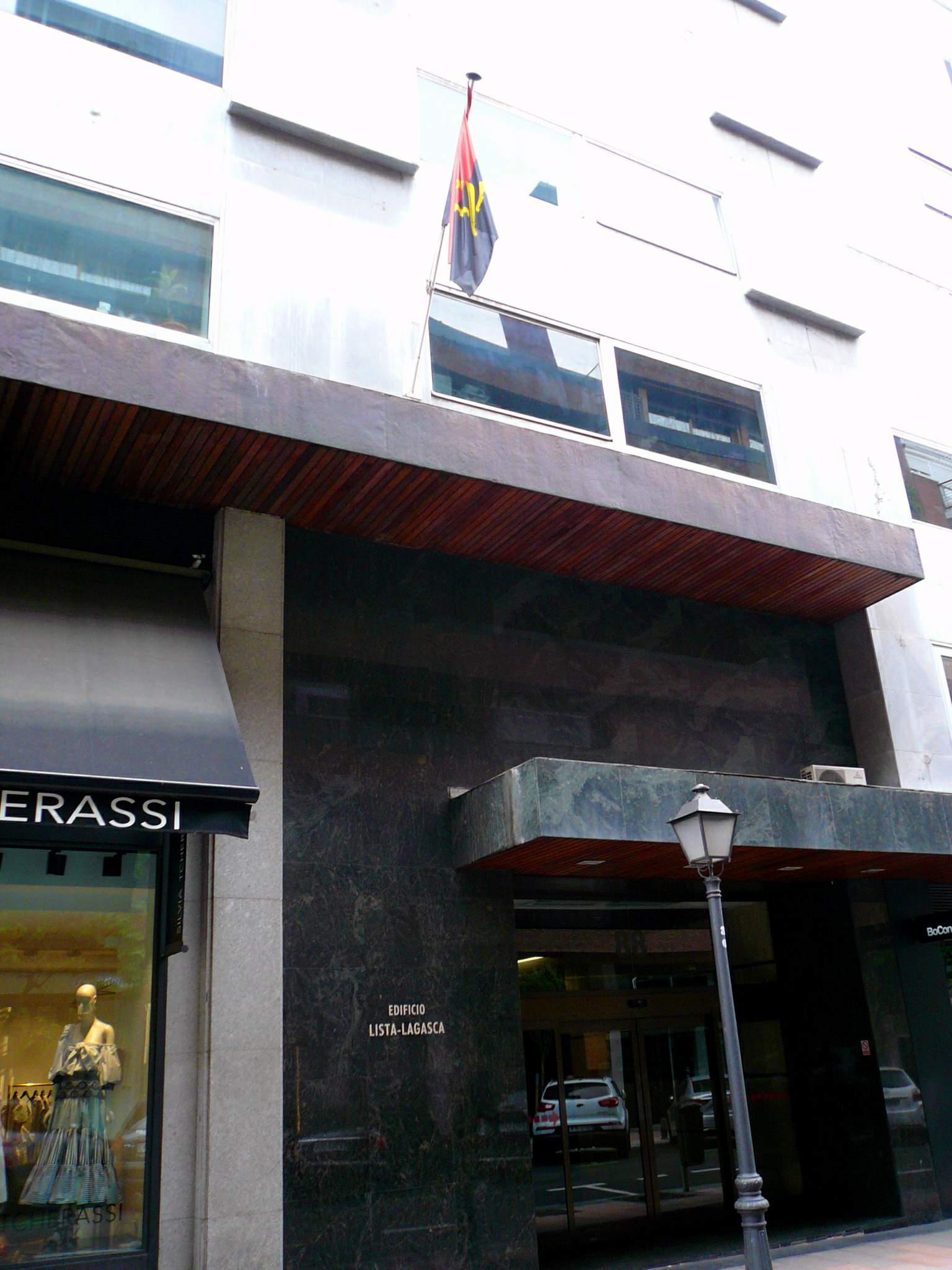
Embassy in Madrid

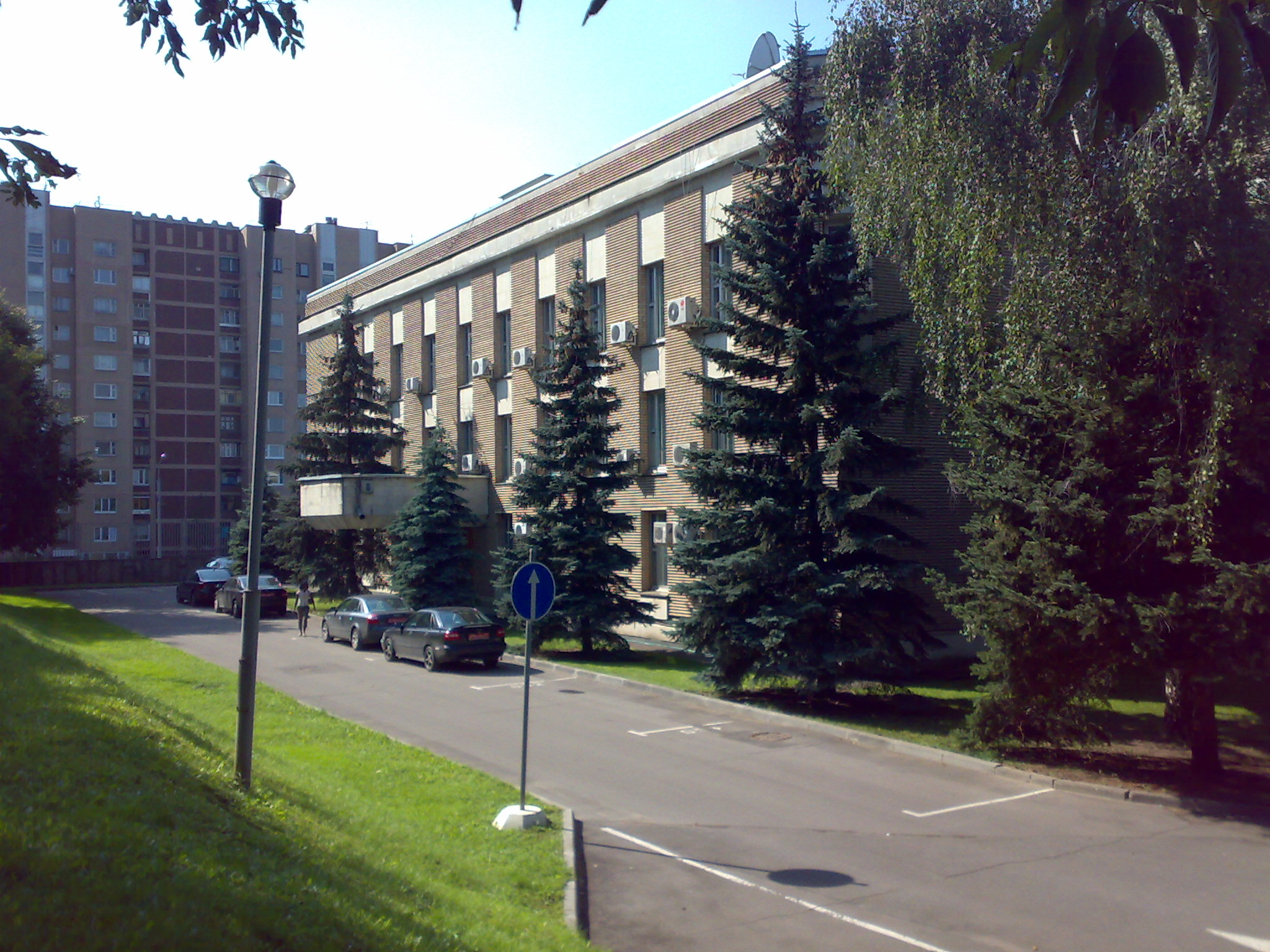
Embassy in Moscow

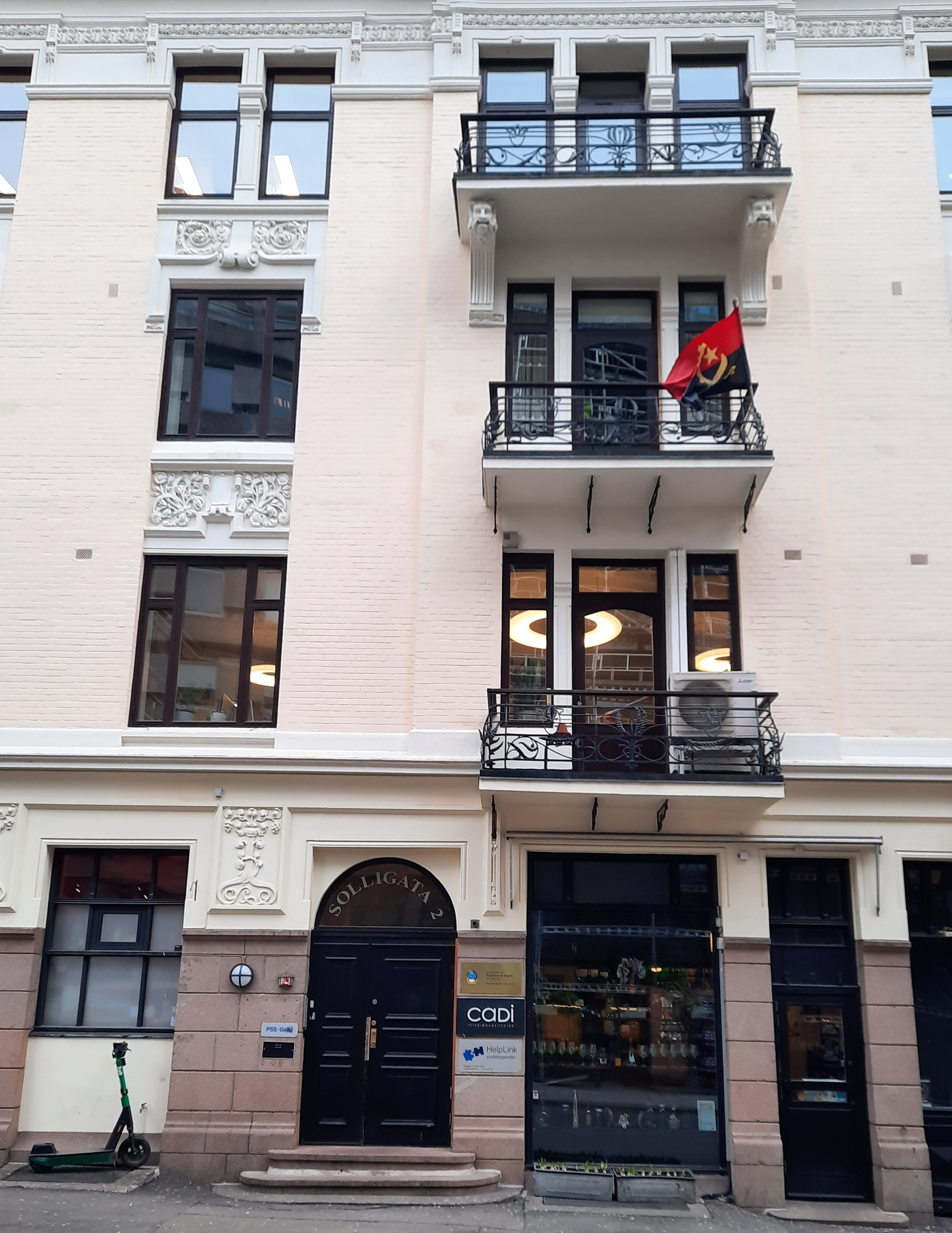
Building hosting the Embassy in Oslo

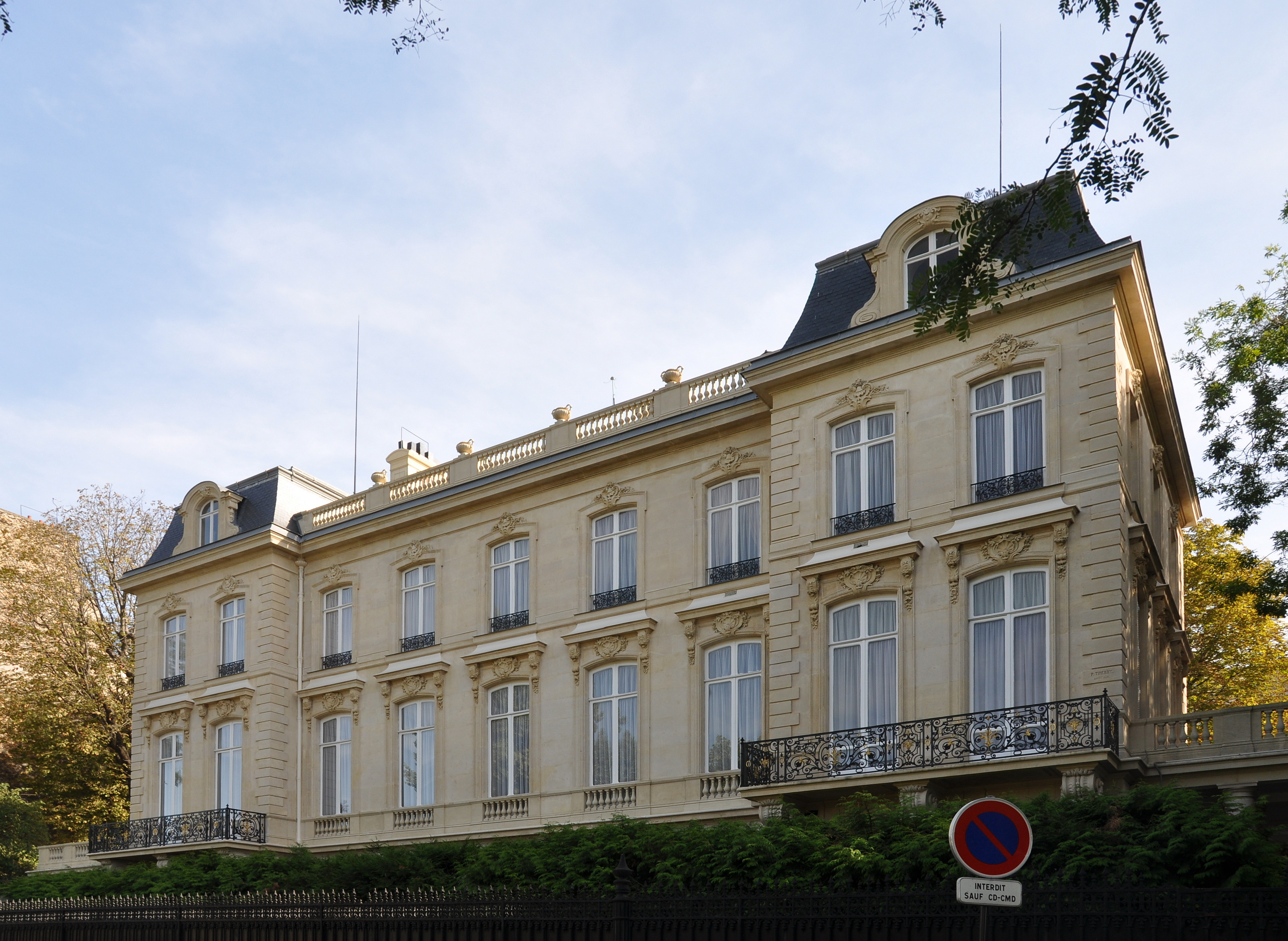
Embassy in Paris

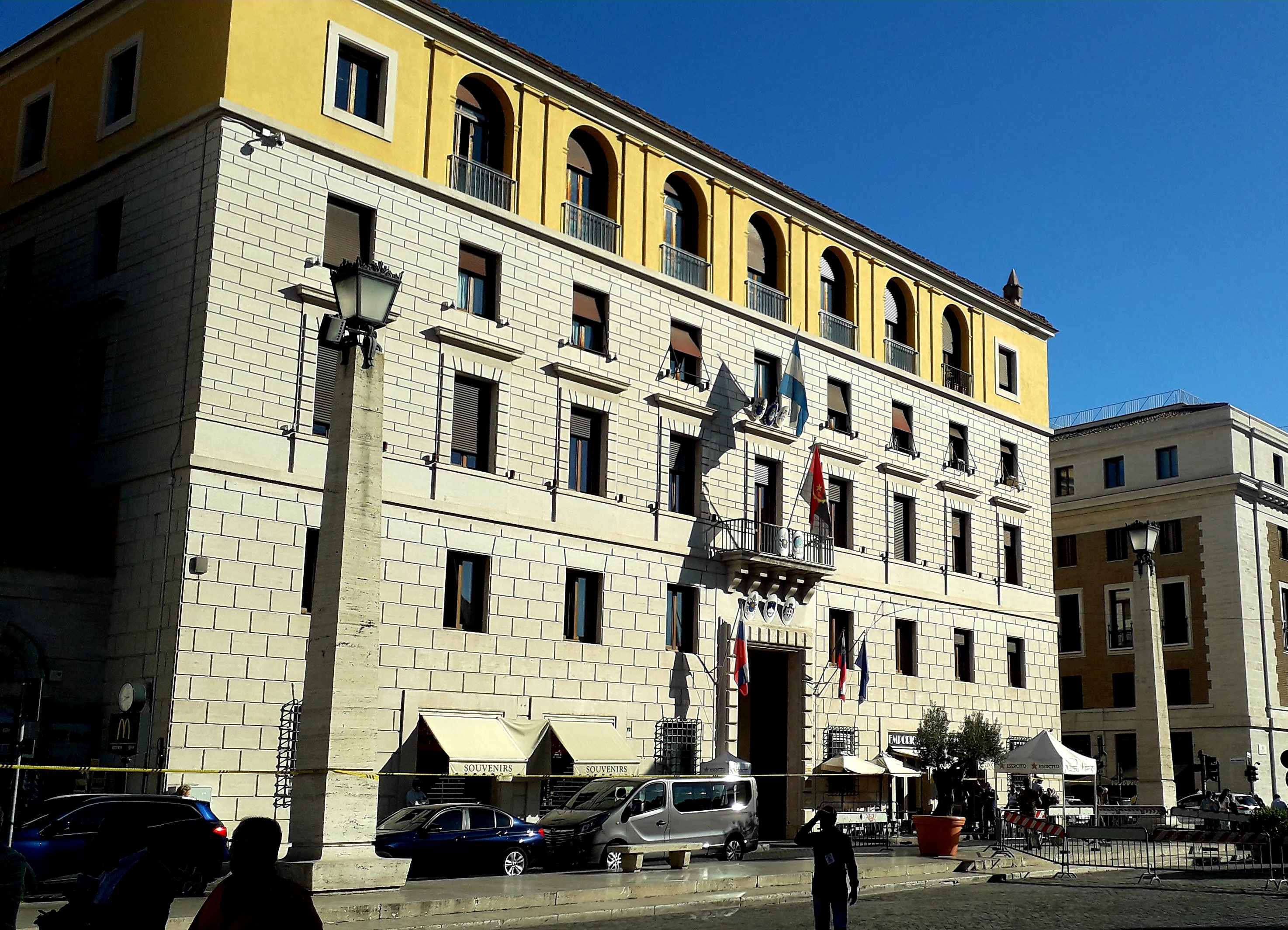
Building hosting the Embassy to the Holy See in Rome

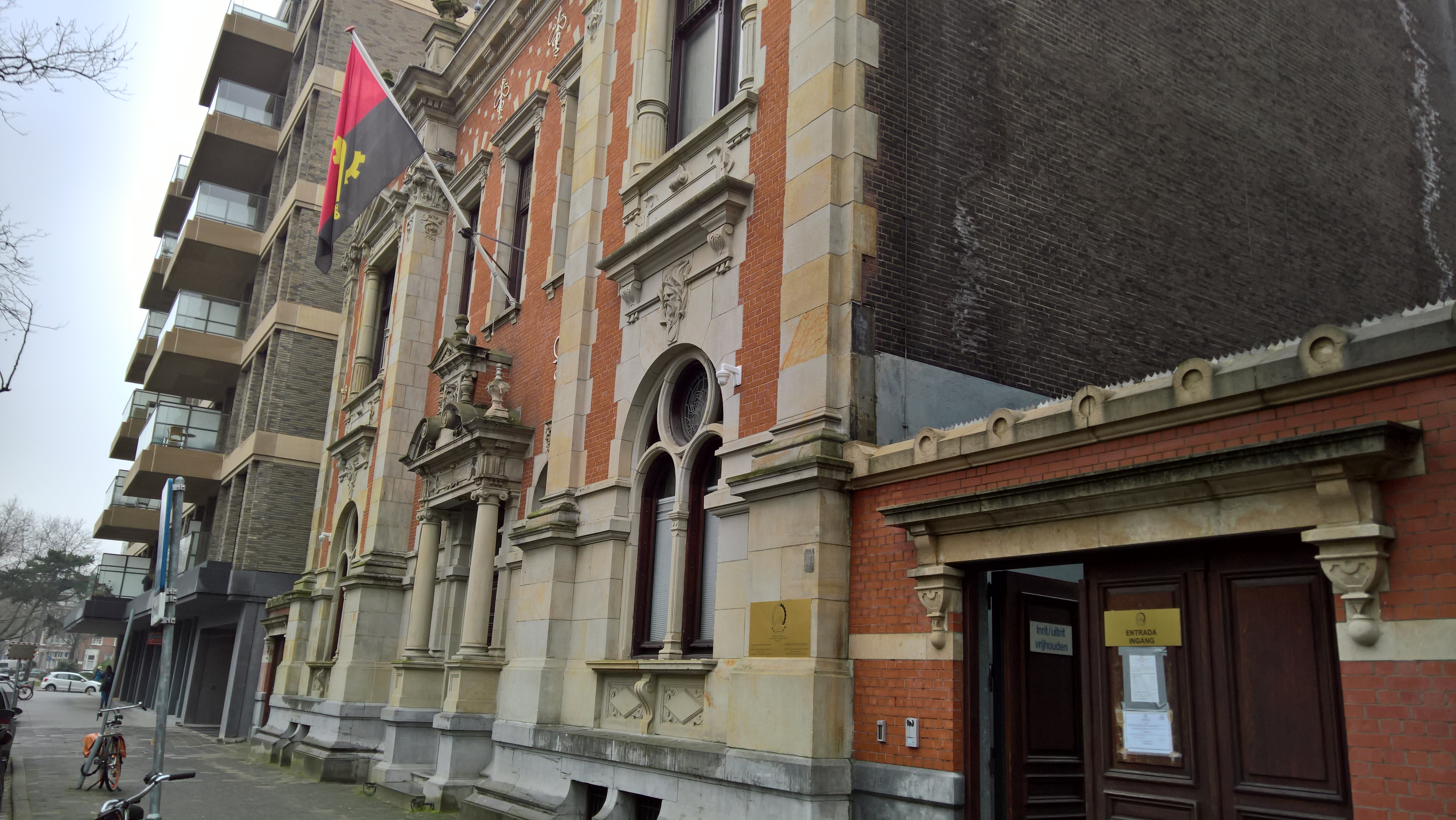
Consulate-General in Rotterdam

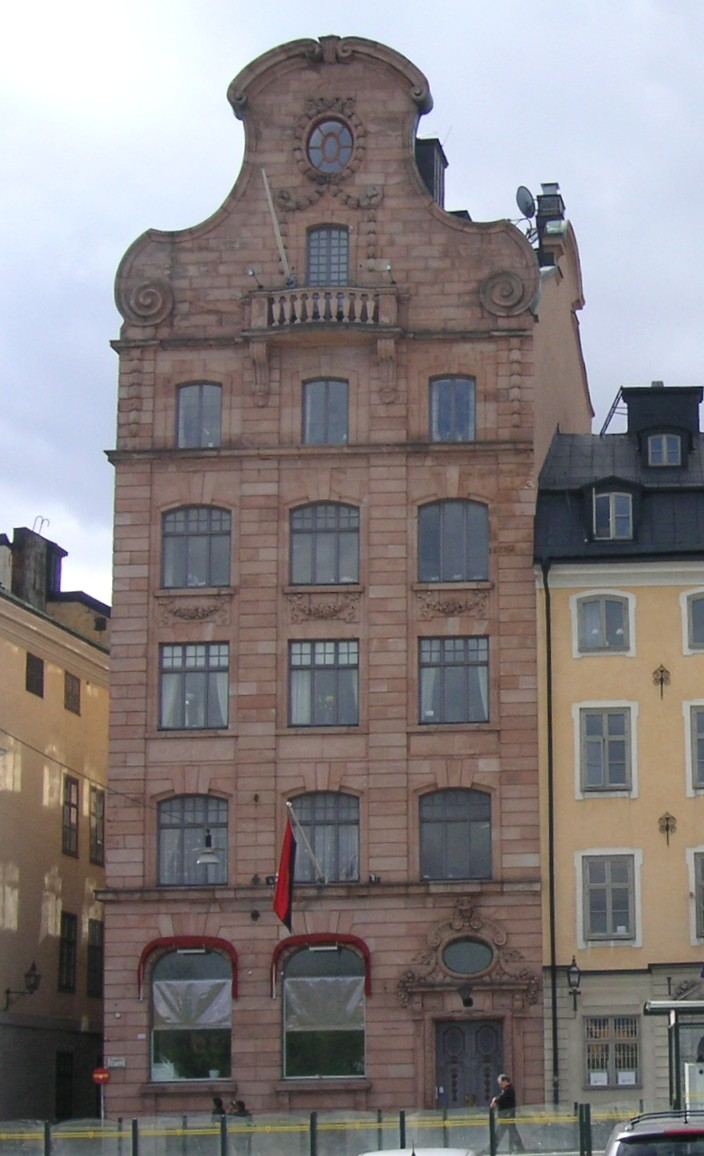
Embassy in Stockholm

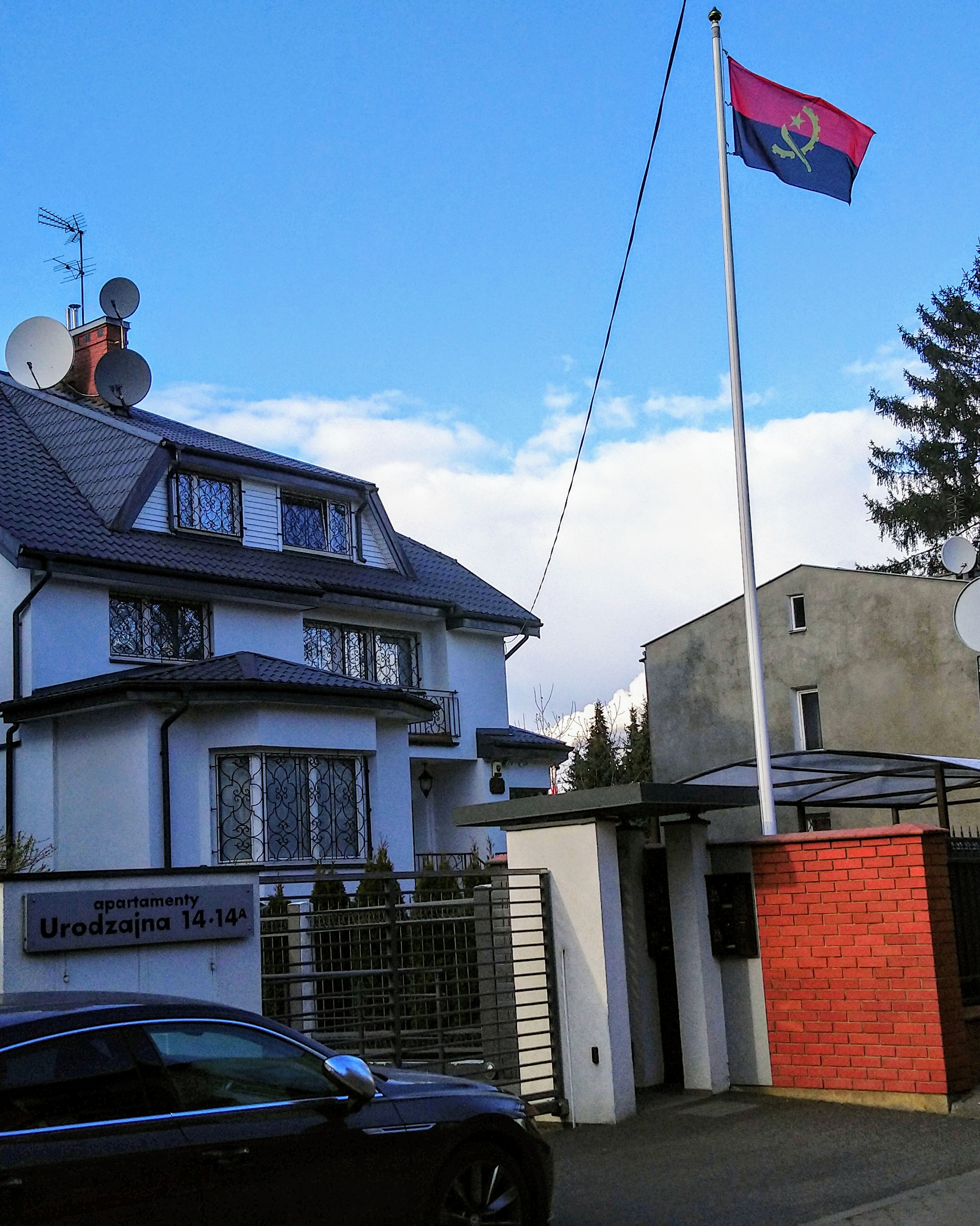
Embassy in Warsaw

=== Oceania ===
Host country	Host city	Mission	Concurrent accreditation	Ref.
Australia	Canberra	Embassy	Countries: New Zealand	

=== Multilateral organizations ===
Organization	Host city	Host country	Mission	Ref.
Community of Portuguese Language Countries	Lisbon	Portugal	Permanent Mission	
United Nations	New York City	United States	Permanent Mission	
United Nations	Geneva	Switzerland	Permanent Mission	
UNESCO	Paris	France	Permanent Mission	

== Closed missions ==
=== Africa ===
Host country	Host city	Mission	Year closed	Ref.
Libya	Tripoli	Embassy	Unknown	
South Africa	Durban	Consulate-General	2018	

=== Americas ===
Host country	Host city	Mission	Year closed	Ref.
Canada	Ottawa	Embassy	2018	
Mexico	Mexico City	Embassy	2018	
United States	Los Angeles	Consulate-General	2018	

=== Asia ===
Host country	Host city	Mission	Year closed	Ref.
China	Hong Kong	Consulate-General	2018	
Singapore	Singapore	Embassy	2024	

=== Europe ===
Host country	Host city	Mission	Year closed	Ref.
Czechia	Prague	Embassy	Unknown	
France	Toulouse	Consulate-General	2011	
Germany	Frankfurt	Consulate-General	2018	
Greece	Athens	Embassy	2018	
Portugal	Faro	Consulate-General	2018	
Slovakia	Bratislava	Embassy	Unknown	

== See also ==
- Foreign relations of Angola
- List of diplomatic missions in Angola
- Visa policy of Angola
- Visa requirements for Angolan citizens
