= Angolan passport =

Travel document

Angolan passport; Passaporte angolano
- The front cover of an Angolan passport
- Type: Passport
- Issued by: Angola
- Purpose: Identification
- Eligibility: Angolan citizenship

An Angolan passport (Portuguese: Passaporte angolano) is a travel document issued to citizens of Angola to facilitate international travel. Passports are issued by the Migration and Foreigners Services (Serviços de Migração e Estrangeiros) office in Luanda. Passports issued by the previous issuing body, the National Directorate of Emigration and Borders of Angola (Dnefa), became invalid on 19 April 2001.

As of 1 January 2017, Angolan citizens had visa-free or visa on arrival access to 45 countries and territories, ranking the Angolan passport 90th in terms of travel freedom (tied with Cameroonian and Vietnamese passports) according to the Henley visa restrictions index.

== See also ==
- Visa requirements for Angolan citizens
