= Visa policy of Angola =

Policy on permits required to enter Angola

Visitors to Angola must obtain either a visa in advance from one of the Angolan diplomatic missions or a pre-visa online unless they are citizens from one of the visa-exempt countries.

A tourist visa must be used within 60 days from the issue date and is valid for 30 days, a period that can be extended once for an additional period of 30 days. Passports must have a validity of 6 months and at least 2 blank pages. Transit without visa is allowed for passengers continuing their trip to a third country by the same or first departing plane if they do not leave the airport.

In the future, Angola is expected to participate in the KAZA UniVisa programme, which if delivered as planned will allow holders of the KAZA visa to travel freely between Angola, Botswana, Namibia, Zambia, and Zimbabwe.

== Visa policy map ==
Visa policy of Angola Angola Visa not required (bilateral agreements) Visa not required (30 days) eVisa

== Visa exemption ==
=== Ordinary passports ===
The following countries are exempt from visas under bilateral agreements.

- Namibia
- Mozambique
- São Tomé and Príncipe
- South Africa
- Zambia

According to the Government of Angola, citizens of the following countries and territories may enter Angola without a visa for up to 30 days per visit, with a total maximum of stay of 90 days per calendar year (3 visa-free entries of up to 30 days per calendar year):

- All European Union member states

- Algeria
- Antigua and Barbuda
- Argentina
- Australia
- Bahamas
- Barbados
- Belize
- Botswana
- Brazil
- Canada
- Cape Verde
- Chile
- China
- Dominican Republic
- Equatorial Guinea
- Eswatini
- Fiji
- Grenada
- Guyana
- Haiti
- Hong Kong
- Iceland
- India
- Indonesia
- Israel
- Jamaica
- Japan
- Kiribati
- Lesotho
- Madagascar
- Malawi
- Marshall Islands
- Mauritius
- Mexico
- Micronesia
- Monaco
- Morocco
- Nauru
- New Zealand
- Norway
- Palau
- Panama
- Papua New Guinea
- Philippines
- Qatar
- Russia
- Rwanda
- Saint Kitts and Nevis
- Saint Lucia
- Saint Vincent and the Grenadines
- Samoa
- Saudi Arabia
- Seychelles
- Singapore
- Solomon Islands
- South Korea
- Suriname
- Switzerland
- Tanzania
- Timor-Leste
- Tonga
- Trinidad and Tobago
- Turkey
- Tuvalu
- United Arab Emirates
- United Kingdom
- United States
- Uruguay
- Vanuatu
- Vatican City
- Zimbabwe

Date of visa changes
- 2009: Namibia
- 1 December 2017: Mozambique and South Africa
- 30 March 2018: Botswana, Mauritius, Seychelles, Singapore and Zimbabwe
- 1 July 2018: Cabo Verde and Rwanda
- 15 August 2018: Zambia
- 28 September 2023: 98 countries
- 17 October 2025: Philippines

=== Non-ordinary passports ===
In addition, holders of diplomatic or official/service passports of the following countries may also enter Angola without a visa for a maximum period of 30 days:

- Algeria
- Argentina
- Brazil
- Cape Verde
- China
- DR Congo
- Cuba
- Egypt
- France
- Guinea-Bissau
- Hungary
- Indonesia
- Italy
- Mauritius
- Mozambique
- Portugal
- Qatar
- Russia
- Sao Tome and Principe
- Saudi Arabia
- Serbia
- Singapore
- South Africa
- South Korea
- Spain^{D} (Note: Under visa exemption agreement on 3 February 2014; from 10 October 2015 Archived 2019-07-04 at the Wayback Machine)
- Switzerland
- Venezuela
- Vietnam
- Zambia

_{D - Diplomatic passports only.}

=== Future changes ===
Angola has signed visa exemption agreements with the following countries, but they have not yet entered into force:

Country	Passports	Agreement signed on
Armenia	Diplomatic, service	25 September 2026
Macau	Ordinary	4 September 2026
Benin	Diplomatic, service	10 July 2024
Timor-Leste	Diplomatic, service	10 July 2024
Djibouti	Diplomatic, service	21 February 2024
Ghana	Diplomatic, service	9 August 2019
Morocco	Diplomatic	20 June 2017
Republic of the Congo	Diplomatic, service	March 2015

== Electronic visa (e-Visa) ==
Citizens from any other country that requires a visa may apply for an e-Visa.

== Transit ==
Passengers with a confirmed onward ticket for a flight to a third country within 24 hours. They must stay in the international transit area of the airport and have the documents required for their next destination.

== Visitor statistics ==
Most visitors arriving in Angola were from the following countries of nationality:

Country	2015	2014
Portugal	82,629	219,258
South Africa	49,424	56,852
China	76,016	49,965
Brazil	70,184	44,001
Namibia	61,505	25,079
France	20,097	18,806
United Kingdom	14,267	18,363
DR Congo	13,824	692
Congo	11,432	613
India	9,170	6,464
Italy	9,150	17,274
Total	592,495	594,998

== See also ==
- Visa requirements for Angolan citizens
