= List of diplomatic missions in Angola =

This is a list of diplomatic missions in Angola. There are currently 62 embassies in Luanda, and many countries maintain consulates in other Angolan cities (not including honorary consulates).

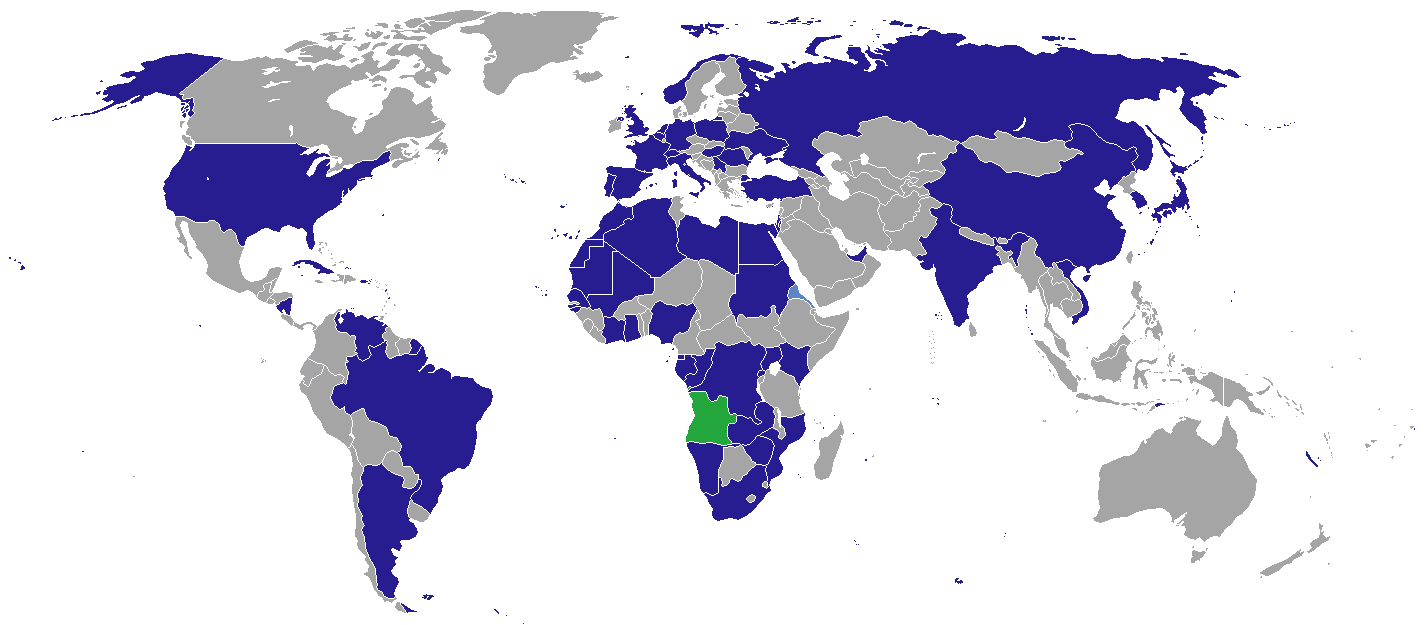
Map of diplomatic missions in Angola

== Diplomatic missions in Luanda ==
=== Embassies ===
1. Algeria
2. Argentina
3. Belgium
4. Brazil
5. Cape Verde
6. China
7. Congo-Brazzaville
8. Congo-Kinshasa
9. Cuba
10. Egypt
11. Equatorial Guinea
12. France
13. Gabon
14. Germany
15. Ghana
16. Guinea
17. Guinea-Bissau
18. Holy See
19. Hungary
20. India
21. Israel
22. Italy
23. Ivory Coast
24. Japan
25. Kenya
26. Libya
27. Mali
28. Mauritania
29. Morocco
30. Mozambique
31. Namibia
32. Netherlands
33. Nicaragua
34. Nigeria
35. Norway
36. Palestine
37. Poland
38. Portugal
39. Romania
40. Russia
41. Rwanda
42. Sahrawi Republic
43. São Tomé and Príncipe
44. Senegal
45. Serbia
46. South Africa
47. South Korea
48. Sovereign Military Order of Malta
49. Spain
50. Sudan
51. Switzerland
52. Timor-Leste
53. Turkey
54. Uganda
55. Ukraine
56. United Arab Emirates
57. United Kingdom
58. United States
59. Venezuela
60. Vietnam
61. Zambia
62. Zimbabwe

=== Other missions or delegations ===
- European Union (Delegation)

== Consular missions ==
=== Luanda ===
- Brazil (Consulate-General)
- Eritrea (Consulate-General) (Note: Subordinate to the embassy in Pretoria, South Africa.)

=== Benguela, Benguela Province ===
- Cape Verde (Consulate)
- Portugal (Consulate-General)

=== Cabinda, Cabinda Province ===
- Congo-Brazzaville (Consulate-General)

=== Luena, Moxico Province ===
- Congo-Kinshasa (Consulate-General)
- Zambia (Consulate-General)

=== Menongue, Cubango Province ===
- Namibia (Consulate-General)

=== Ondjiva, Cunene Province ===
- Namibia (Consulate-General)

== Non-resident embassies accredited to Angola ==
=== Resident in Kinshasa, Congo-Kinshasa ===
1. Chad
2. Ethiopia
3. Greece

=== Resident in Lisbon, Portugal ===
1. Croatia
2. Cyprus
3. Ireland
4. Philippines
5. Slovakia

=== Resident in Maputo, Mozambique ===
1. Canada
2. Finland
3. Eswatini
4. Mauritius

=== Resident in Pretoria, South Africa ===
1. Australia
2. Austria
3. Bulgaria
4. Burkina Faso
5. Chile
6. Colombia
7. Czechia
8. Denmark
9. Dominican Republic
10. Ecuador
11. Eritrea
12. Georgia
13. Iran
14. Jamaica
15. Lesotho
16. Liberia
17. Lithuania
18. Mexico
19. New Zealand
20. Paraguay
21. Peru
22. Qatar
23. Seychelles
24. Somalia
25. South Sudan
26. Trinidad & Tobago

=== Resident in Windhoek, Namibia ===
1. Botswana
2. Indonesia
3. Malaysia

=== Resident in other cities ===
1. Bangladesh (Abuja)
2. Belarus (Harare)
3. Cameroon (Brazzaville)
4. Djibouti (Addis Ababa)
5. Malta (Valletta)
6. North Korea (Malabo)
7. Oman (Cairo)
8. Pakistan (Kigali)
9. Saudi Arabia (Lusaka)
10. Sweden (Stockholm)
11. Tanzania (Lusaka)
12. Yemen (Addis Ababa)

== Closed missions ==
Host city	Sending country	Mission	Year closed	Ref.
Luanda	Bulgaria	Embassy	Unknown	
Luanda	Czechia	Embassy	2010	
Luanda	Ecuador	Embassy	2019	
Luanda	Mexico	Embassy	2009	
Luanda	North Korea	Embassy	2023	
Luanda	Sweden	Embassy	2022	
Luanda	Tanzania	Embassy	Unknown	
Luanda	Uruguay	Embassy	2021	

== See also ==
- Foreign relations of Angola
- List of diplomatic missions of Angola
