= Angolan nationality law =

Angolan Nationality Law

Parliament of Angola
- Long title: Lei nº 02/16, de 15 de abril de 2016: Lei da Nacionalidade, que estabelece as condições de atribuição, aquisição, perda e reaquisição da nacionalidade angolana
- Enacted by: Government of Angola
- Status: Current legislation

Angolan nationality law is regulated by the Constitution of Angola, as amended; the Nationality Act, and its revisions; and various international agreements to which the country is a signatory. These laws determine who is, or is eligible to be, a national of Angola. The legal means to acquire nationality, formal legal membership in a nation, differ from the domestic relationship of rights and obligations between a national and the nation, known as citizenship. Angolan nationality is typically obtained under the principle of jus sanguinis, i.e. by birth in Angola or abroad to parents with Angolan nationality. It can be granted to persons with an affiliation to the country, or to a permanent resident who has lived in the country for a given period of time through naturalization.

== Obtaining Angolan nationality ==
Nationality can be obtained in Angola through birth or naturalization. Angolan law makes a distinction between attribution and acquisition of nationality. Attribution is automatic and from birth; whereas, acquisition is obtained later and effective into the future.

=== By birth ===
Births must be registered in the Civil Registry Office and proof of the parents' nationality must be provided. Proof may be presentation of the parents' birth registration or an identity card. In the case of a birth abroad, a declaration made before consular officials, may also be required.

- Persons born anywhere to at least one parent who has Angolan nationality;
- Newborn foundlings, under one year of age, with no discernible evidence as to the nationality or identity of its parents; or
- Persons who later in life discovered that at birth they had a parent of Angolan nationality.

=== By naturalization ===
Angolan nationality may be acquired through application for persons who have reached eighteen, the age of majority, and have legal capacity, to the Ministry responsible for immigration. They must provide documentation to confirm identity, economic status, and lack of a serious criminal record, as well as evidence of satisfactory examinations by the Citizenship Commission. Applicants must demonstrate that they are of good character, can integrate with Angolan society, are self-sufficient and able to sustain themselves, and have no criminal record with penalties exceeding three year sentencing. In addition, applicants must take examinations to confirm their understanding of Angolan civics, adequate ability in Portuguese, and knowledge of the cultural and societal norms of the territory. Ten years of residency is calculated from the date of issuance of a permit for permanent residency. Upon approval, applicants must take an Oath of Allegiance. Besides foreigners meeting the criteria, other persons who may apply for naturalization include:

- Spouses of, or persons in Registered Partnerships with Angolan nationals, as long as the union is legally valid and on-going, the foreign partner consents, and the union occurred at least five years prior to the request;
- Minor adoptees, for those over age fourteen with the child's consent, upon request and certification of an adoption order;
- Children under the age of fourteen who have been abandoned or orphaned;
- Minor children, or incapacitated persons, of naturalized Angolan parents;
- Stateless persons who have no other nationality, upon request without meeting general criteria; or
- Persons who have rendered exceptional artistic, athletic, entrepreneurial, or scientific service to the nation, at the discretion of the National Assembly or President.

== Loss of nationality ==
Angolans who were attributed nationality at birth cannot be deprived of it. They are allowed to renounce their nationality, provided the renunciation is officially recorded in the Central Registry Office. Persons can be denaturalized in Angola by committing a crime against state security; by serving another nation in an official capacity without having informed the Angolan National Assembly beforehand; by serving in a foreign military; by having obtained nationality through fraud, false representation, or concealment; or for having acquired Angolan nationality but using other nationality to obtain benefits restricted to specific classes of persons.

== Dual nationality ==
Angola has allowed dual nationality since 1991. The Nationality Law of 1984 discouraged dual nationality, but recognized that based on international agreements such status might exist either voluntarily or involuntarily. Since 1991, the Nationality Law has not banned dual nationality, but recognized that other nationality possessed of Angolans must not have legal applicability while in Angola.

== History ==
=== Kingdom of Kongo (1350–1575) ===
The territory which is Angola was traditionally part of the lands conquered and consolidated by agreement of the rulers of Mpemba Kasi in the period between 1350 and 1375. Around 1390, the capital of the Kingdom of Kongo was established at M'banza-Kongo by Lukeni lua Nimi, the first king. The kingdom was expanded by alliance and conquest through the sixteenth century. Though the provinces and sub-provinces typically retained their independence, they paid tribute and owed allegiance to the king. The ruling hierarchy dominated village economies where communal lands were farmed and goods were distributed between the laboring households. Rents and surplus produce was paid to the local ruling class, whose authority was likely based upon kinship networks. Larger towns were supported by plantation production which was worked by slaves, who belonged to the local nobility. Representatives of the ruling class typically divided their living spaces between the town and countryside to ensure that taxes, which facilitated acquisition trade goods, were paid. The king's authority was established through his control of the estates that supported the capital and his strategic use of lineage and patronage. To ensure the support of the nobility, the king dispatched nobles to rural areas for short periods of time and as an incentive for success moved them to more important districts and eventually to the capital.

Between 1482 and 1484, Portuguese explorer Diogo Cão explored the Zaire River estuary and encountered the inhabitants of the kingdom. A second exploration by Cão took place between 1485 and 1486, wherein he made his way to the capital, M'banza-Kongo. In 1491, a fleet including priests, soldiers and builders, arrived and after making their way to the capital, baptized king Nzinga a Nkuwu, who took the name João, and five of his leading chieftains. João's son Nzinga Mbemba, who took the name Afonso I, was also baptized that year. Afonso became a committed Christian and used Christianity to expand and consolidate his reign when he succeeded his father in 1506. In 1509, Afonso used Portuguese troops to assist in subduing the territories to the north of Nsundi, which included Nsanga and Masinga, two copper producing towns which were aligned with the Tio Kingdom. Throughout his reign Afonso was involved in the slave trade with the Portuguese, who needed the labor for their Brazilian plantations.

Upon Afonso's death, the kingdom weakened and saw a succession of short-lived monarchs reign between 1545 and 1568. Calling on his Portuguese allies for support, when M'banza-Kongo was sacked by the Yaka people in 1569, Álvaro I sought refuge on an island in the Congo River. Sebastião I of Portugal sent 600 men under the command of Francisco Gouveia Sottomaior, the governor of São Tomé, who were able to restore Álvaro to the throne in 1574. In exchange for his support, Sebastião had Álvaro sign official papers of vassalage and agree to assist the Portuguese in establishing a colony in the Kingdom of Ndongo in an area south of the Cuanza River. Sebastião had already given Paulo Dias de Novais a royal charter to colonize and establish the Kingdom of Angola, over which he would become the Captain-Governor and hereditary overlord.

=== Portuguese period (1575–1975) ===
Dias established the Colony of Angola by occupying Luanda Island in 1575. He founded the capital of Luanda the following year with a hundred families and four hundred soldiers. Until the 1920s, Portugal held Luanda and Benguela, which it founded in 1587, but was unable to extend its control to the interior of the country because of resistance to colonization, internal warfare, and tropical disease which killed potential settlers. Under the Ordinances of Manuel I (Portuguese: Ordenações Manuelinas), compiled by Portugal in 1521, courts were given leeway to interpret common law and local custom in the territories without established High Courts. Nationals were defined as those born in Portuguese territory and leaving the territory without permission of the sovereign was grounds for denaturalization. In 1603, the Ordinances of Philip I (Portuguese: Ordenações Filipinas) established that Portuguese nationals were children born on the Iberian Peninsula or adjacent islands, Brazil, or to an official in service to the crown in the Portuguese possessions of Africa or Asia, whose father was a native of Portugal, or whose mother was a native of Portugal and whose father was a foreigner who had established domicile in Portugal for a minimum of ten years. Those who were not in service to the crown in the colonies (except Brazil) were not considered to be Portuguese. A child could not derive nationality directly from its mother unless it was illegitimate.

The first Constitution of Portugal, drafted in 1822, defined subjects of the Portuguese crown as the children of a male, native to any of the territories of the kingdom. The nationality scheme laid out in 1603 remained mostly unchanged except for some clarifications, such as legitimate children of a Portuguese father or illegitimate children of a Portuguese mother born abroad could be nationals if they resided in Portugal and children born to a Portuguese mother and foreign father could only derive Portuguese nationality upon reaching their majority and requesting it. Two new provisions included that foundlings discovered on Portuguese soil were considered nationals, as were freedmen. Naturalization was only available to foreign men who married Portuguese women, and only if they had investments in the country or provided service to the crown. Denaturalization resulted from service to, or receiving benefits from, a foreign government, or obtaining other nationality. A new constitution was adopted in 1826 (which was in force from 1826 to 1828, 1834 to 1836, and 1842 to 1910) which granted nationality to anyone born on Portuguese soil. Birth by descent was accepted as establishing nationality, as long as the father lived in Portugal or was abroad in service to the monarch. Provisions stipulated that only illegitimate children could derive nationality from their mother and established that a nationality law was to define provisions for naturalization.

The new nationality code was promulgated as the Decree of 22 October 1836, which established that grounds for naturalization included having reached majority, demonstrating adequate means of self-support, and having a minimum of two years residency, which could be waived if one had Portuguese ancestry. The Civil Code of 1867 reiterated similar nationality requirements to those that had previously been in effect, with the exception that a foreign woman, upon marriage to a Portuguese husband, automatically acquired Portuguese nationality. It also provided that Portuguese women who married foreigners lost their nationality, unless they would become stateless, and could not reacquire Portuguese status unless the marriage terminated and she lived in Portugal. It retained the provisions of the 1836 Decree for naturalization but increased residency to three years and added stipulations that applicants must have completed their military duties to their country of origin and that they have no criminal record. The Indigenous Code (Portuguese: código indígenato) of 1899, specified that the native population of Angola was governed by customary African law, while the white, non-native population were subject to Portuguese law. The Code created two classes of citizens and a differentiation in who received or did not receive full rights. The nationality requirements remained stable and did not significantly change again until 1959, when a new Nationality Law (Lei n.º 2098), granted Portuguese nationality to anyone born in Angola, unless the parents were foreign diplomats. Married women continued to derive their nationality from their husband, with the exception that a woman could retain her nationality of origin if she specifically declared she did not want to be Portuguese and could prove that her country of origin allowed retention of her nationality after marriage.

After extensive conflict between 1961 and 1974, Portugal agreed to begin the process of decolonization and by the Decree of 25 April 1974 created the African countries of Angola, Cape Verde, Guinea Bissau, Mozambique, and São Tomé e Principe. This was precipitated by the collapse of the Estado Novo dictatorship in Portugal, that year. The Alvor Agreement, was drafted the following January, laid out the terms of independence for Angola. Among the terms were provisions for nationality which specified that those born in Angola, unless they chose to retain other nationality, would become Angolan nationals on 11 November 1975. It also provided that persons residing in Angola who were not born there, Angolan-born persons living in Portugal, and Portuguese nationals domiciled in Angola would have their legal status clarified in law. Before statutes could be drawn or elections held for a constitutional convention, political factions in Angola resumed fighting. In an attempt to settle the nationality question of those in the new countries, Portugal promulgated Decree-Law 308/75 on 24 June 1975. Its terms assumed that Angolan nationality would be provided to inhabitants of the territory and proclaimed that those who would not lose Portuguese nationality at independence included only persons born in Portugal but living abroad and persons born abroad in the territory but who had established long-term ties with Portuguese culture by living in Portugal. No option was offered to other Portuguese nationals to retain their status and the automatic loss of nationality left many former colonial nationals stateless.

=== Post-independence (1975–present) ===
The Angolan Constitution of 1975 neither defined who were nationals nor requirements to gain nationality. These were contained in the first Nationality Law which was written in 1975. It provided Angolan nationality to persons born in the territory or children born abroad to at least one parent who was Angolan, provided that they did not have foreign nationality or their parents were not in Angola in service as a foreign diplomat. For those who were over the majority at independence, the Law of 1975 provided blanket nationality to those born in Angola and the option of declaring they wanted Angolan status if they were born abroad to Angolan parents. Those who did not want to be Angolan were allowed to renounce their nationality within one year of independence. Foreigners could be naturalized after ten years of residency or a three-year residency if they were married to an Angolan and provisions were made for naturalization for those who had assisted in the independence movement. Children of naturalized persons followed the status of their parent, but were allowed to opt in or out of Angolan nationality upon reaching their majority. Nationality could be withdrawn from those who opposed independence or acted to cause death of the civil population. Angola was unique among African nations for its early adoption of the principles of equality for men and women, mainly because of its Socialist period.

The Nationality Law has been amended numerous times, in 1984, 1991, 2005 and 2016. The 1984 version strongly discouraged dual nationality, provided confirmation that foundlings or children who otherwise would be stateless were Angolan, and established that persons who would lose their nationality upon marriage to an Angolan national could obtain Angolan nationality. A Nationality Regulation (Decree No. 1/86) was passed in 1986, which was in effect until 2017. It required that births be registered with the Angolan Central Registry Office (Portuguese: Conservatória dos Registos Centrais) or if abroad with consular officials. It required that proof of parental nationality, or lack thereof, be provided. It also specified documentation requirements for other means of acquiring Angolan nationality and for the first time laid out provisions for acquiring nationality through adoption. During a cease-fire between 1991 and 1992 in the Angolan Civil War, the Constitution of Angola underwent a major amendment (Law no. 12/91) and added Article 19, providing that nationality and citizenship in Angola would be acquired or lost by specifications in legislation. Under terms of the revised Nationality Law in 1991, distinction was drawn between those who automatically gained nationality and citizenship through attribution (birth), and those who gained them through acquisition (naturalization). It marked a change in the treatment of dual nationality as well, treating it as acceptable, unless the person specifically renounced their Angolan nationality.

In 1992, a Provisional Constitution was enacted, with the expectation that it would remain in place only until the National Assembly could draft a permanent charter, but the Civil War resumed, leaving the Provisional Constitution in place. It was slightly changed by amendments in 1996 and 2005. Also in 2005, the Nationality Law was amended with the goal of preventing fraudulent marriages and stipulated that the duration of the marriage had to be at least five years and a change of nationality required spousal consent. The amendment also added acquisition of nationality through fraudulent means as a basis for denaturalization. In 2010, a new constitution was adopted which included grounds for attribution or acquisition of nationality as specified in the 1991 Nationality Law, making them foundational rights. In 2016 the Nationality Law was amended, keeping the same basic scheme, but making naturalization more difficult. It specifically excluded foreign nationals, and their descendants, who were born in Angola prior to independence from acquiring Angolan nationality if they had not previously taken steps to acquire a passport or identification card. This provision was enacted to curtail a surge in immigration of dual nationals who acquired Angolan nationality and then used their dual status arbitrarily to gain advantages, such as avoiding immigration regulations, or using their other nationality to gain benefits offered to foreigners.
