= List of Catholic dioceses in Angola and São Tomé and Príncipe =

The Roman Catholic Church in Angola is composed of a Latin hierarchy only, which comprises three ecclesiastical provinces, each headed by a Metropolitan Archbishop, and a total of fifteen suffragan dioceses.

Although exempt (i.e. Immediately subject to the Holy See), the Diocese of São Tomé and Príncipe, an Atlantic island country which shares a Portuguese colonial history (and linguistic legacy) with Angola, is part of the transnational Episcopal Conference of Angola and São Tomé, while neither has a national Episcopal Conference.

Neither country has an Eastern Catholic or pre-diocesan jurisdiction.

There is an Apostolic Nunciature to Angola (in national capital Luanda) as papal diplomatic representation (embassy-level), into which is also vested the Apostolic Nunciature to São Tomé and Príncipe.

== Current Latin sees ==
=== Angola ===
==== Ecclesiastical Province of Huambo ====
- Metropolitan Archdiocese of Huambo
  - Diocese of Benguela
  - Diocese of Ganda
  - Diocese of Kwito-Bié

==== Ecclesiastical Province of Luanda ====
- Metropolitan Archdiocese of Luanda
  - Diocese of Cabinda
  - Diocese of Caxito
  - Diocese of Mbanza Congo
  - Diocese of Sumbe
  - Diocese of Viana

==== Ecclesiastical Province of Lubango ====
- Metropolitan Archdiocese of Lubango
  - Diocese of Menongue
  - Diocese of Ondjiva
  - Diocese of Namibe

==== Ecclesiastical Province of Malanje ====
- Metropolitan Archdiocese of Malanje
  - Diocese of Ndalatando
  - Diocese of Uíje

==== Ecclesiastical Province of Saurimo ====
- Metropolitan Archdiocese of Saurímo
  - Diocese of Dundo
  - Diocese of Lwena

=== São Tomé and Príncipe ===
- Diocese of São Tomé and Príncipe (exempt)

== See also ==
- List of Roman Catholic dioceses in Angola by name
- List of Catholic dioceses (structured view)
- Catholic Church in Angola
- Catholic Church in São Tomé and Príncipe

== Defunct jurisdictions ==
Excluding precursors of present sees (usually pre-diocesan).

There are no titular sees.

In Angola, one was suppressed without (direct) successor :

- Mission sui juris of Cunene

== Sources and external links ==
- GCatholic.org - data for every section.
- Catholic-Hierarchy
