= António Francisco Jaca =

Angolan Roman Catholic prelate (born in 1963)

The Most Reverend António Francisco Jaca
- Bishop of Benguela, Angola
- Church: Catholic Church
- Archdiocese: Roman Catholic Archdiocese of Huambo
- See: Roman Catholic Diocese of Benguela
- Appointed: 26 March 2018
- Installed: 26 March 2018
- Predecessor: Eugenio Dal Corso
- Successor: Incumbent
- Other posts: 1. Bishop of Caxito (6 June 2007 - 26 March 2018); 2. Apostolic Administrator of Caxito (3 May 2018 -16 August 2020)

Orders
- Ordination: 29 September 1990 by Eugénio Salessu
- Consecration: 22 Jul 2007 by Cardinal Ivan Cornelius Dias

Personal details
- Born: António Francisco Jaca; 3 November 1963 (age 62) Quessua, Malanje Province, Archdiocese of Malanje, Angola

Styles of António Francisco Jaca
- Reference style: His Eminence
- Spoken style: Your Eminence
- Religious style: Monsignor

António Francisco Jaca S.V.D. (born 3 November 1963) is an Angolan prelate of the Catholic Church who is the Bishop of the Roman Catholic Diocese of Benguela in Angola since 26 March 2018. Before then, from 6 June 2007, until 26 March 2018, he was Bishop of the Diocese of Caxito, Angola. He was appointed bishop by Pope Benedict XVI on 6 June 2007. He was consecrated bishop in Luanda on 22 July 2007. He was installed at Caxito on 14 October 2007. On 26 March 2018 Pope Francis transferred him to Benguela and appointed him as the local ordinary there. He was installed at Benguela on 9 June 2018. He concurrently served as apostolic administrator of the Roman Catholic Diocese of Caxito from 3 May 2018 until 16 August 2020.

== Early life and education ==
António Francisco Jaca was born on 3 November 1963 at Quessua, Malanje Province, Archdiocese of Malanje in northcentral Angola. He attended elementary and secondary schools in his home area. He studied at the "Propaedeutic Seminary of Malanje". He studied philosophy from 1981 until 1984, at the Luanda Archdiocecan Major Seminary in Luanda. In 1985, he entered the Institute of the Word Rabbi, in Kinshasa, Democratic Republic of the Congo. He completed his studies of theology in 1990 at the Seminary of the Missionaries of Scheut (Theologate Eugene de Mazenot) in Kinshasa, as well. He holds a Bachelor's degree in social communication, majoring in communication sciences, obtained from the University of São Paulo in Ottawa in Canada. He continued his studies and graduated with a Master's degree in the same field of study from the University of Montreal, in Quebec in 1998.

== Priest ==
He became a member of the Society of the Divine Word, while in seminary. He took his preliminary vows as a member of that religious Order in 1987. He took his solemn vows in 1990. He was ordained a priest for the same Society on 29 September 1990 by Eugénio Salessu, at that time Bishop of Malanje. He served as priest until 6 June 2007.

He served in various roles and locations while a priest, including:

- Vicar to the Catholic Mission of N'zeto, in the Diocese of Mbanza Congo from 1991 until 1993.
- Studies in Canada leading to the award of bachelor's and master's degrees from 1994 until 1998.
- Director of Radio Ecclesia in Luanda from 1999 until 2002.
- Provincial Superior of the Divine Word Missionaries in Angola from 2002 until 2007.

== Bishop ==
On 6 June 2007, Pope Benedict XVI created the Diocese of Caxito, a suffragan of the Roman Catholic Archdiocese of Luanda. The Holy Father appointed Reverend Father Antoni Francisco Jaca, S.V.D., the Provincial Superior of the Divine Word Missionaries in Angola, as the pioneer bishop of the new diocese. He was installed at Caxito on 14 October 2007. He was consecrated bishop on 22 July 2007 in Luanda by Cardinal Ivan Cornelius Dias, Cardinal-Priest of Spirito Santo alla Ferratella assisted by Damião António Franklin, Archbishop of Luanda and Luis María Pérez de Onraita Aguirre, Bishop of Malanje.

On 26 March 2018, Pope Francis transferred Bishop António Francisco Jaca, S.V.D. to Benguela and appointed him as the local ordinary there. He was installed at Benguela on 9 June 2018. He succeeded Bishop Eugénio Dal Corso, whose age-related retirement request was accepted by The Holy Father, effective 26 Mar 2018. Bishop António Francisco Jaca concurrently served as apostolic administrator of Caxito Catholic Diocese, Angola from 3 May 2018 until 16 August 2029. As of 2024, he continues to serve as the bishop of Benguela Catholic Diocese.

== See also ==
- Catholic Church in Angola

== Succession table ==
Catholic Church titles
Preceded by Eugenio Dal Corso (18 February 2008 - 26 March 2018)	Bishop of Benguela (since 26 March 2018)	Succeeded by Incumbent
Preceded by Diocese created	Bishop of Caxito (6 June 2007 - 26 March 2018)	Succeeded by Maurício Agostinho Camuto (since 15 Jun 2020)
