= Eugenio Dal Corso =

Italian prelate of the Catholic Church (1939–2024)

His Eminence Eugenio Dal Corso P.S.D.P.
- Bishop of Benguela
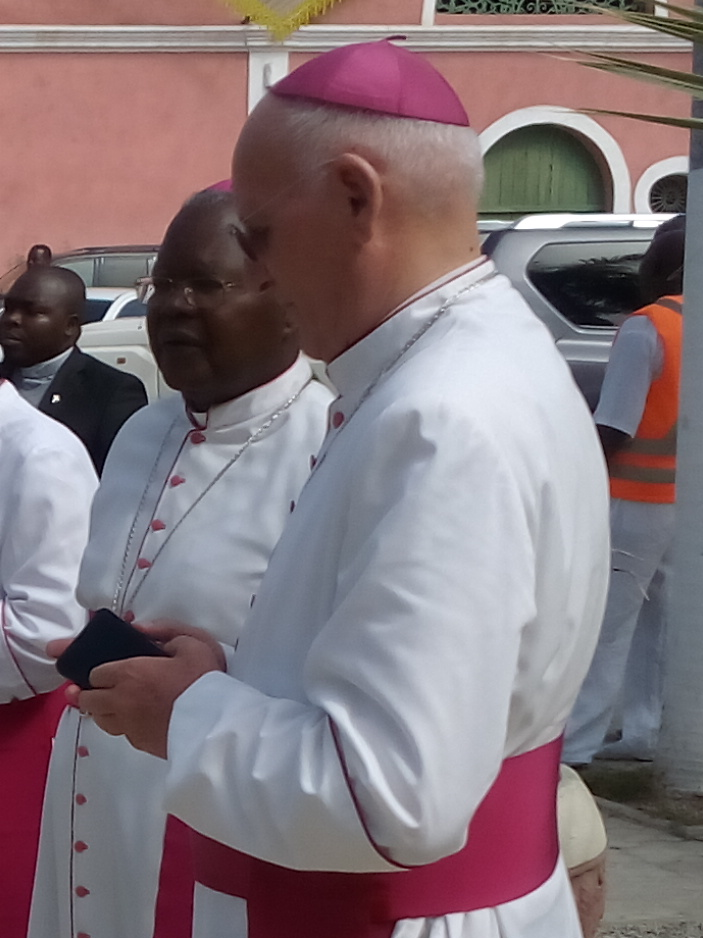
- Church: Catholic Church
- Diocese: Benguela
- Appointed: 18 February 2008
- Term ended: 26 March 2018
- Predecessor: Oscar Lino Lopes Fernandes Braga
- Successor: António Francisco Jaca S.V.D.
- Other post: Cardinal-Priest of Sant'Anastasia (2019–2024)
- Previous posts: Coadjutor Bishop of Saurimo (1996–1997); Bishop of Saurimo (1997–2008)

Orders
- Ordination: 7 July 1963
- Consecration: 3 March 1996 by Félix del Blanco Prieto
- Created cardinal: 5 October 2019 by Pope Francis
- Rank: Cardinal-Priest

Personal details
- Born: 16 May 1939 Lugo di Valpantena, Italy
- Died: 20 October 2024 (aged 85) Negrar di Valpolicella, Italy
- Motto: Buscai primeiro o Reino de Deus (Seek first the kingdom of God)
- Coat of arms

Eugenio Dal Corso (16 May 1939 – 20 October 2024) was an Italian prelate of the Catholic Church who led two dioceses in Angola, as Coadjutor and Bishop of Saurimo from 1996 to 2008 and as Bishop of Benguela from 2008 to 2018. He was a professed member of the Poor Servants of Divine Providence and worked as a missionary in Argentina and Angola from 1975 to 1996.

Pope Francis raised him to the rank of cardinal on 5 October 2019.

== Biography ==
Eugenio Dal Corso was born in Lugo di Valpantena di Grezzana near Verona on 16 May 1939 as the second of six children to Rodolfo Dal Corso and Teresa Bellorio; he was given the name "Eugenio" to honor Pope Pius XII who was elected pope two months earlier.

From the age of ten, he attended the Don Calabria Institute and there decided to become a missionary. (Note: Don Calabria is the name commonly used for the Italian priest Giovanni Calabria (1873–1954), a saint since 1999, who founded the Poor Servants of Divine Providence.) Dal Corso made his religious profession in the Poor Servants of Divine Providence religious congregation in 1956 and was ordained in the Casa di Nazareth on 7 July 1963. He then completed his studies in dogmatics while he also doing pastoral work in the Madonna di Campagna parish in Verona as well as in Naples. He also taught theology from 1967 to 1968. Dal Corso began his career as a missionary in the city of Laferrere in Buenos Aires Province in January 1975, where he helped educate new priests. After just over a decade there, he was assigned to the missions in Luanda, Angola, in March 1986. One of his projects there was the construction of a seminary in Uíje In 1991, he was appointed the Provincial Superior of his order in Angola.

Pope John Paul II appointed Dal Corso the Coadjutor Bishop of Saurimo on 15 December 1995. He received his episcopal consecration on 3 March 1996 from Archbishop Félix del Blanco Prieto, with Bishops Andrea Veggio and Pedro Marcos Ribeiro da Costa serving as the principal co-consecrators. He became Bishop of Saurimo when his predecessor retired on 15 January 1997. On 18 February 2008, Pope Benedict XVI named him Bishop of Benguela. Pope Francis accepted his resignation on 26 March 2018 at the age of 78.

While bishop he served for a time as secretary general and president of the Episcopal Commission for Evangelization of the Episcopal Conference of Angola and São Tomé.

After retiring as bishop, he remained in Angola, serving as parish priest for Santa Josefina Bakhita pastoral center in Caiundo, a small community in the province of Kuando Kubango.

Pope Francis announced on 1 September 2019 that he would make Dal Corso a cardinal. At a consistory in Rome on 5 October 2019, Pope Francis made him Cardinal Priest of Sant'Anastasia al Palatino. He was the first member of his order to become a cardinal.

After the consistory, he was not healthy enough to return to his parish in Angola. He retired to a nursing home in Negrar di Valpolicella and died there on 20 October 2024, at the age of 85.

== See also ==
- Cardinals created by Francis
- Catholic Church in Angola

Catholic Church titles
| Preceded by Pedro Marcos Ribeiro da Costa | Bishop of Saurimo; 15 January 1997 – 18 February 2008 | Succeeded by José Manuel Imbamba |
| Preceded by Oscar Lino Lopes Fernandes Braga | Bishop of Benguela; 18 February 2008 – 26 March 2018 | Succeeded by António Francisco Jaca |
| Preceded by Godfried Danneels | Cardinal-Priest of Sant'Anastasia; 5 October 2019 – 20 October 2024 | Succeeded by Vacant |
