= Joaquim Nhanganga Tyombe =

Angolan Catholic prelate (born 1969)

The Most Reverend Joaquim Nhanganga Tyombe
- Bishop of Uije, Angola
- Church: Catholic Church
- Archdiocese: Roman Catholic Archdiocese of Malanje
- See: Roman Catholic Diocese of Uije
- Appointed: 2 February 2021
- Installed: 21 March 2021
- Predecessor: Fernando Guimarães Kevanu
- Successor: Incumbent

Orders
- Ordination: 24 November 2001
- Consecration: 7 March 2021 by Gabriel Mbilingi
- Rank: Bishop

Personal details
- Born: Joaquim Nhanganga Tyombe; 22 November 1969 (age 56) Mambandi-Cacula, Huíla Province, Archdiocese of Lubango, Angola

Styles of Joaquim Nhanganga Tyombe
- Reference style: Your Lordship; The Most Reverend
- Spoken style: His Lordship
- Religious style: Bishop

Joaquim Nhanganga Tyombe (born 22 November 1969) is an Angolan Roman Catholic prelate who is the bishop of the Roman Catholic Diocese of Uije in Angola since 2 February 2021. Before that, from 24 November 2001 until he was appointed bishop, he was a priest of the Roman Catholic Archdiocese of Lubango in Angola. He was appointed bishop by Pope Francis. He was consecrated bishop at Lubango on 7 March 2021. He was installed at Uíge, Angola on 21 March 2021.

== Background and education ==
He was born on 22 September 1969 in Mambandi-Cacula, Huíla Province, Archdiocese of Lubango, in Angola. He studied at the Christ the King Philosophy Seminary in Huambo and the Good Shepherd Seminary in Benguela. From 1996 until 2000, he studied at the Saint John Vianney Seminary, Pretoria, in South Africa, where he graduated with a Bachelor's degree in 2001. From 2003 until 2004, he attended a course in planning and participatory management of community projects in Bibala-Namibe. He graduated with a Doctorate in Systematic Theology from the Catholic University of Portugal in Lisbon, where he studied from 2010 until 2012. He also studied at the ISCTE – University Institute of Lisbon between 2012 and 2016, graduating with degree in school administration.

== Priest ==
He was ordained a priest on 24 November 2001 for the Roman Catholic Archdiocese of Lubango. He served as a priest until 2 February 2021.

While a priest, he served in various roles and locations, including:

- Parish priest of the Our Lady Queen of the World Mission in Bibala and Camucuio, Namibe Diocese from 2001 until 2006.
- Superior of the Our Lady Queen of the World Mission in Bibala and Camucuio, Namibe Diocese from 2001 until 2006.
- Training course in planning and participatory management of community projects in Bibala-Namibe from 2003 until 2004.
- Director of the Instituto de Ciêcias Religiosas de Angola (ICRA), in Lubango.
- Member of the archdiocesan pastoral secretariat and presbyteral council.
- Studies at the Catholic University of Portugal, leading to the award of a doctorate in systematic theology, from 2010 until 2012.
- Studies at the ISCTE – University Institute of Lisbon leading to the award of a degree in school administration from 2012 to 2016.
- Cooperator vicar in the Santos Rei Magos do Campo Grande parish in Lisbon from 2010 until 2016.
- Rector and lecturer of the Fr. Leonardo Sikufinde Major Seminary in Lubango from 2016 until 2021.

== Bishop ==
He was appointed bishop of the Roman Catholic Diocese of Uije, Angola by Pope Francis on 2 February 2021. He was consecrated bishop at Lubango on 7 March 2021 by Gabriel Mbilingi, Archbishop of Lubango assisted by Giovanni Gaspari, Titular Archbishop of Alba Maritima and Filomeno do Nascimento Vieira Dias, Archbishop of Luanda. As of 2024, he continued to serve as the local ordinary of that Catholic diocese.

== See also ==
- Catholic Church in Angola

== Succession table ==
Catholic Church titles
Preceded by Emílio Sumbelelo (2 February 2008 - 11 February 2019)	Bishop of Uije (since 2 February 2021)	Succeeded by Incumbent
