= Firmino David =

Angolan Roman Catholic prelate (born 1962)

The Most Reverend Firmino David
- Bishop of Sumbe, Angola
- Church: Catholic Church
- Archdiocese: Roman Catholic Archdiocese of Luanda
- See: Roman Catholic Diocese of Sumbe
- Appointed: 4 May 2023
- Installed: 20 August 2023
- Predecessor: Luzizila Kiala
- Successor: Incumbent

Orders
- Ordination: 21 April 1991 by Francisco Viti
- Consecration: 23 July 2023 by Zeferino Zeca Martins

Personal details
- Born: Firmino David; 13 April 1962 (age 63); Sasalakata, Archdiocese of Lubango, Huíla Province, Angola

Styles of Firmino David
- Reference style: His Eminence
- Spoken style: Your Eminence
- Religious style: Monsignor

Firmino David (born 13 April 1962) is an Angolan prelate of the Catholic Church who is the Bishop of the Roman Catholic Diocese of Sumbe in Angola since 4 May 2023. Before then, from 21 April 1991 until he was appointed bishop, he was a priest of the Roman Catholic Archdiocese of Huambo, Angola. He was appointed bishop by Pope Francis. He was consecrated bishop in Huambo on 23 July 2023. He was installed at Sumbe on 20 August 2023.

== Early life and education ==
He was born on 13 April 1962 in Sasalakata, Archdiocese of Lubango, Huíla Province, in Angola. He studied philosophy and theology at the seminary in his home diocese. From 1995 until 2000, he studied at the Pontifical Urban University in Rome, where he graduated with a Licentiate and a Doctorate in Canon Law.

== Priest ==
He was ordained a priest by Francisco Viti, then Archbishop of Huambo, on 21 April 1991 for the Roman Catholic Archdiocese of Huambo. He served as a priest until 4 May 2023.

While a priest, he served in various roles and locations, including:

- Vice-chancellor of the Curia from 1991 until 1993.
- Parish vicar from 1991 until 1993.
- Parish priest of Santo António e São Nuno in Huambo from 1994 until 1995.
- Spiritual director of the minor seminary in Huambo from 1991 until 1994.
- Studies at the Pontifical Urban University in Rome, leading to the award of a licentiate and a doctorate in canon law from 1995 until 2000.
- Parish administrator of the Camunda Mission from 2000 until 2008.
- Member of the College of Consultors from 2000 until 2019.
- Judicial vicar of the Theological Section of Christ the King Major Seminary in Huambo from 2003 until 2017.
- Vice rector of the Theological Section of Christ the King Major Seminary in Huambo from 2005 until 2013.
- Rector of the Theological Section of Christ the King Major Seminary in Huambo from 2013 until 2023.

== Bishop ==
On 4 May 2023, Pope Francis appointed Reverend Firmino David, of the clergy of the archdiocese of Huambo, as the new bishop of the diocese of Sumbe in Angola. He was consecrated at Huambo on 23 July 2023 by Zeferino Zeca Martins, Archbishop of Huambo assisted by Filomeno do Nascimento Vieira Dias, Archbishop of Luanda and Emílio Sumbelelo, Bishop of Viana. He was installed at Sumbe on 20 August 2023.

== See also ==
- Catholic Church in Angola

== Succession table ==
Catholic Church titles
Preceded by Luzizila Kiala (21 May 2013 - 29 September 2021)	Bishop of Sumbe (since 4 May 2023)	Succeeded by Incumbent
