= Almeida Kanda =

Angolan Roman Catholic prelate (born in 1959)

The Most Reverend Almeida Kanda
- Bishop of Ndalatando, Angola
- Church: Catholic Church
- Archdiocese: Roman Catholic Archdiocese of Malanje
- See: Roman Catholic Diocese of Ndalatando
- Appointed: 23 July 2005
- Installed: 20 November 2005
- Predecessor: Pedro Luís Guido Scarpa
- Successor: Incumbent

Orders
- Ordination: 6 July 1986
- Consecration: 23 October 2005 by Giovanni Angelo Becciu

Personal details
- Born: Almeida Kanda; 10 May 1959 (age 66); Cangola, Diocese Uije, Uige Province, Angola

Styles of Almeida Kanda
- Reference style: His Eminence
- Spoken style: Your Eminence
- Religious style: Monsignor

Almeida Kanda (also Almeida Canda) (born 10 May 1959) is an Angolan prelate of the Catholic Church who is the bishop of the Roman Catholic Diocese of Ndalatando in Angola since 23 July 2005. Before then, from 6 July 1986 until he was appointed bishop, he was a priest of the Roman Catholic Diocese of Uije, Angola. He was appointed bishop by Pope Benedict XVI. He was consecrated bishop on 23 October 2005. He was installed at Ndalatando, Angola on 20 November 2005.

== Early life and education ==
Almeida Kanda was born in Cangola in the Diocese of Uíje in Uige Province on 10 May 1959. He attended seminaries in Uíge and Huambo. He holds a degree in canon law, awarded by the Pontifical Gregorian University, in Rome.

== Priest ==
He was ordained a priest for the diocese of Uije on 6 July 1986. He served as a priest until 23 July 2005. While a priest, he served in various roles and locations including.

- Diocesan Curia chancellor.
- Parish priest at the diocesan cathedral.
- Director of the Diocesan Pastoral Office.
- Vicar General of the Diocese of Uíje.
- Professor at the major seminary in Uige.

== Bishop ==
On 23 July 2005 Pope Benedict XVI accepted the age-related resignation of Bishop Pedro Luís Guido Scarpa from the pastoral care of the Diocese of Ndalatando in Angola. The Holy Father appointed Father Monsignor Almeida Kanda, previously Vicar General of the Diocese of Uije as the successor at Ndalatando. He was consecrated bishop on 23 October 2005 by Giovanni Angelo Becciu, Titular Archbishop of Rusellae assisted by José Francisco Moreira dos Santos, Bishop of Uije and Filomeno do Nascimento Vieira Dias, Bishop of Cabinda. He was installed at Ndalatando on 20 November 2005. As of July 2025, he continues to serve as the Local Ordinary of the Diocese of Ndalatando in Angola.

== See also ==
- Catholic Church in Angola

== Succession table ==
Catholic Church titles
Preceded by Pedro Luís Guido Scarpa (26 March 1990 - 23 July 2005)	Bishop of Ndalatando (since 23 July 2005)	Succeeded by Incumbent
