= List of cathedrals in Angola =

This is a list of cathedrals in Angola.

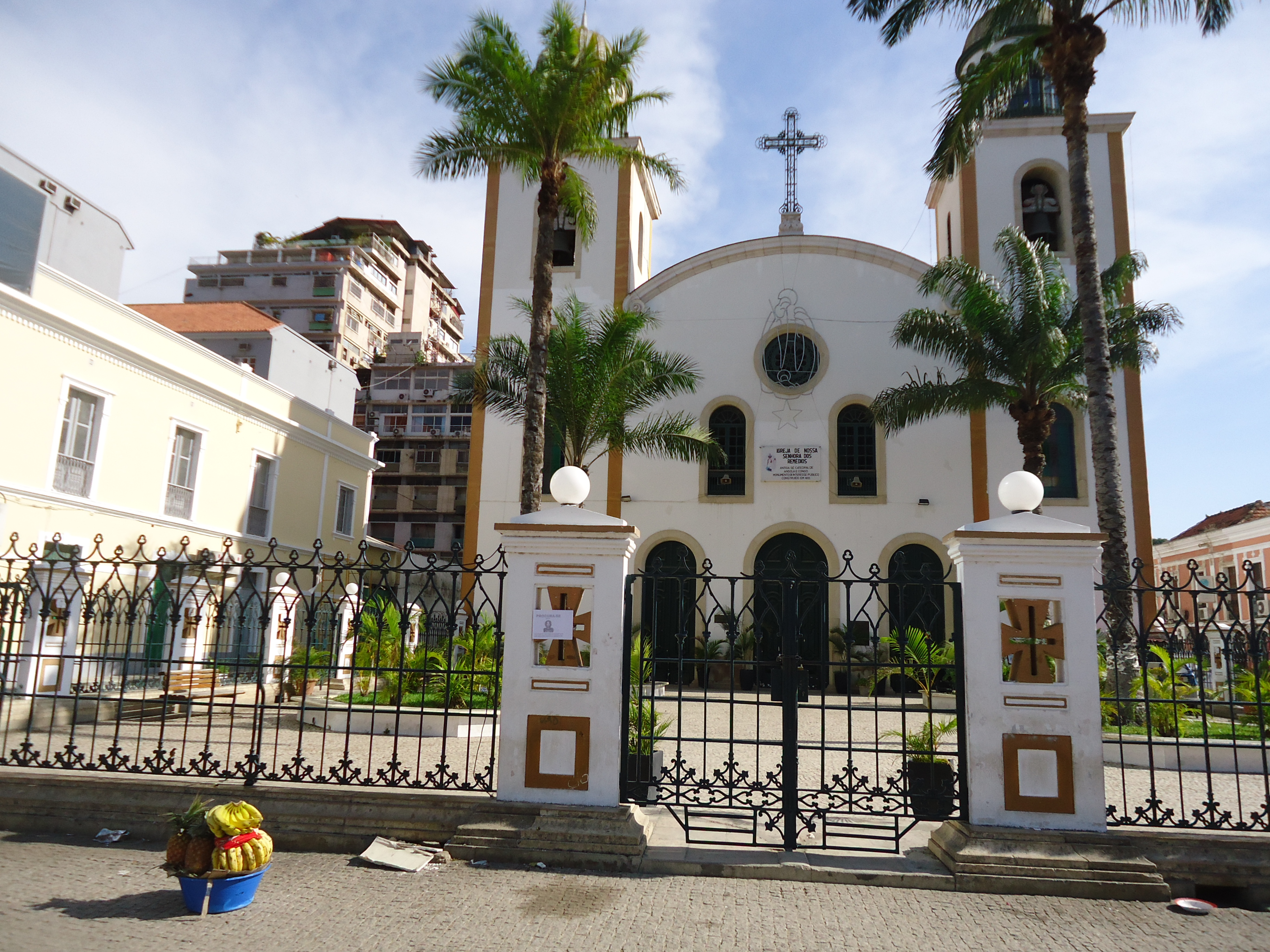
Luanda Cathedral

== Catholic ==
Cathedrals of the Catholic Church in Angola:

- Cathedral of Our Lady of Fatima in Benguela
- Cathedral of Our Lady Queen of the World in Cabinda City
- Cathedral of St. Anne in Caxito
- Cathedral of Our Lady of the Conception in Dundo
- Cathedral of Our Lady of the Conception in Huambo
- Cathedral of St. Lawrence in Kuito
- Cathedral of the Holy Saviour in Luanda
- Cathedral of St. Joseph in Lubango
- Cathedral of Our Lady of Assumption Lwena
- Cathedral of Our Lady of the Assumption in Malanje
- Cathedral of Our Lady of the Conception in M'banza-Kongo
- Cathedral of Our Lady of Fatima in Menongue
- Cathedral of St. Peter in Moçâmedes
- Cathedral of St. John the Baptist in Ndalatando
- Cathedral of Our Lady of Victories in Ondjiva
- Cathedral of Our Lady of the Assumption in Saurímo
- Cathedral of Our Lady of the Conception in Sumbe
- Cathedral of Our Lady of the Assumption in Uíge
- Cathedral of St. Francis of Assisi in Viana

== See also ==
- List of cathedrals
- Christianity in Angola
