= Our Lady of the Conception Cathedral, Sumbe =

Our Lady of the Conception Cathedral
- Sé Catedral de Nossa Senhora da Conceição
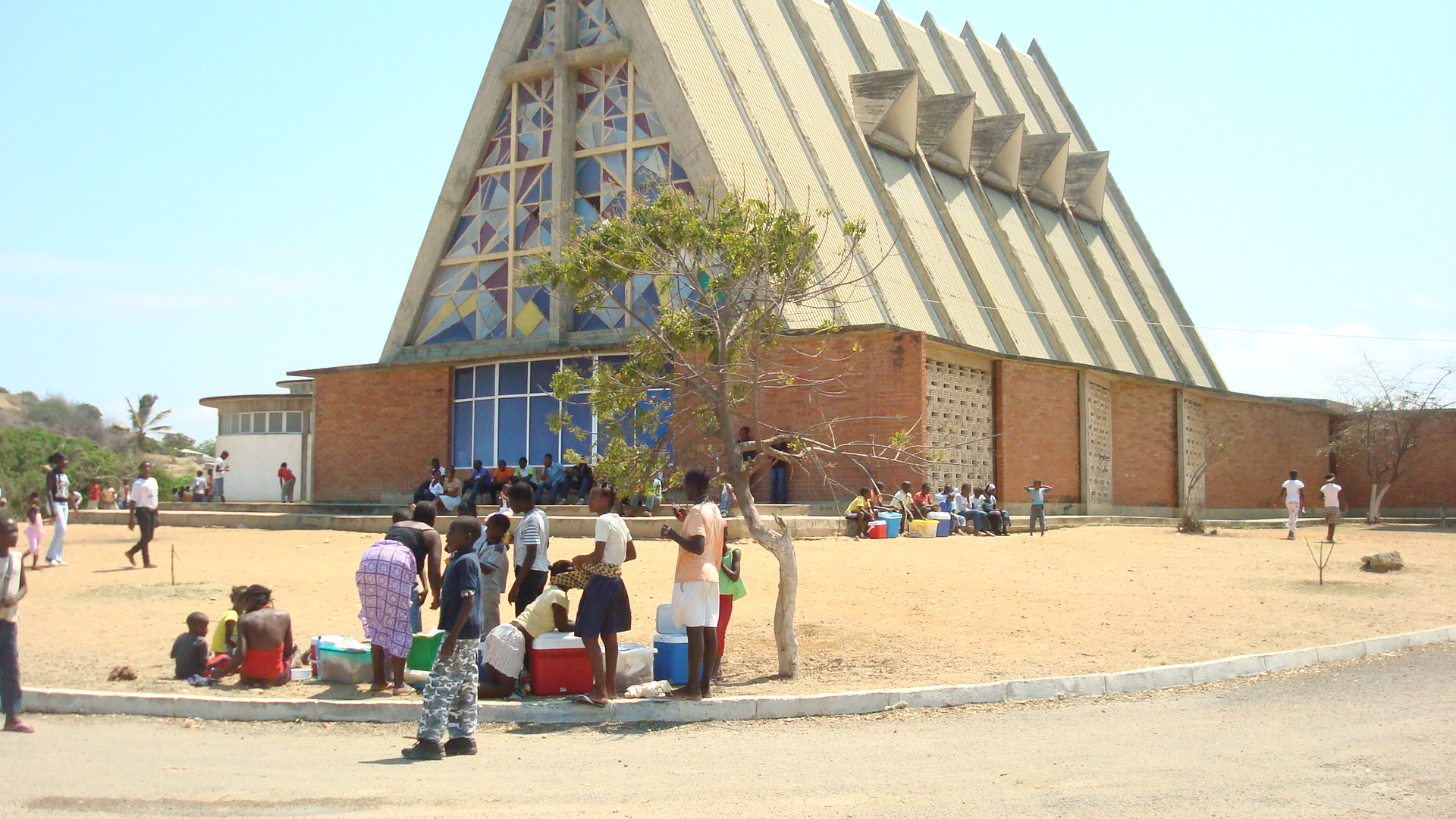
- Our Lady of the Conception Cathedral
- Location: Sumbe
- Country: Angola
- Denomination: Roman Catholic Church

Administration
- Diocese: Roman Catholic Diocese of Sumbe

The Our Lady of the Conception Cathedral (Portuguese: Sé Catedral de Nossa Senhora da Conceição ) also called Sumbe Cathedral Is the name given to a religious building belonging to the Catholic Church located in the city of Sumbe in the province of Cuanza Sul, west of the African country of Angola. As its name indicates it is dedicated to the Immaculate Conception of the Virgin Mary.

The cathedral stands on a plateau overlooking the sea and is the fruit of a 1966 project by Francisco Castro Rodrigues. The structure consists of three different elements in concrete and bricks, gypsum and aluminum, united by a continuous base of bricks Solids.

The cathedral follows the Roman or Latin rite and is the main or mother church of the Diocese of Sumbe (Dioecesis Sumbensis) created in 1975 through the bull "Qui provided Dei" of the then Pope Paul VI and assumed its current name in 2006.

It is under the pastoral responsibility of Bishop Luzizila Kiala.

== See also ==
- Roman Catholicism in Angola
- List of cathedrals in Angola
- Luanda Cathedral

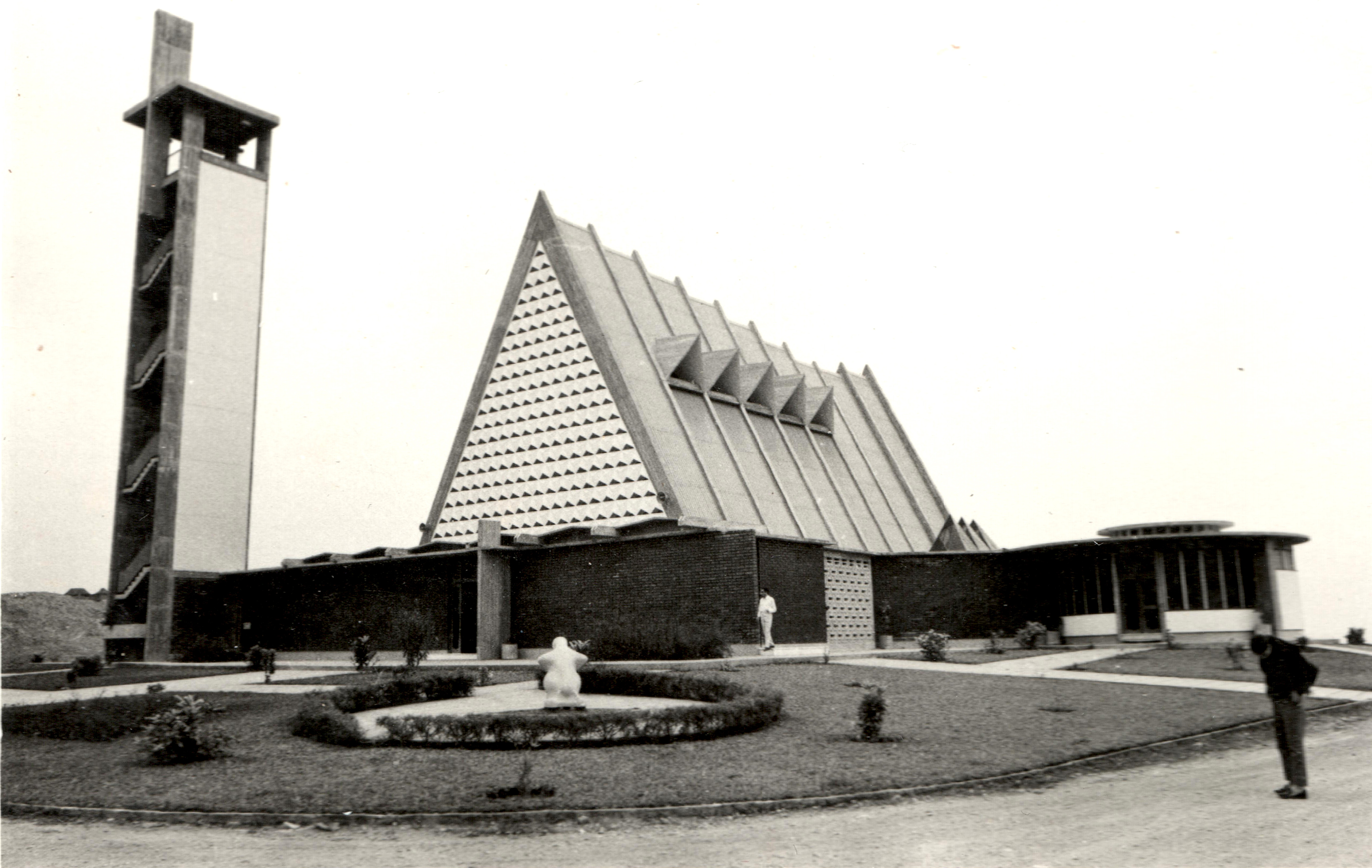
The church ca. 1970
