= Maurício Camuto =

Angolan bishop

Maurício Agostinho Camuto C.S.Sp.
- Bishop of Caxito
- Church: Catholic Church
- Diocese: Diocese of Caxito
- Appointed: 15 June 2020
- Predecessor: António Francisco Jaca

Orders
- Ordination: 28 July 1991
- Consecration: 16 August 2020 by Filomeno do Nascimento Vieira Dias

Personal details
- Born: 26 December 1963 (age 62) Golungo Alto, Overseas province of Angola, Portuguese Empire
- Education: Salesian Pontifical University

Ordination history of Maurício Camuto
History
Priestly ordination
- Date: 28 July 1991
Episcopal consecration
- Date: 16 August 2020

Maurício Agostinho Camuto, C.S.Sp. (born 26 December 1963) is an Angolan bishop of the Catholic Church and a member of the Spiritans. He is the bishop of the Diocese of Caxito, having been appointed to the position in 2020. He previously served as the director of Radio Ecclesia, a Catholic commercial radio station in Angola.

== Early life ==
Camuto was born in Golungo Alto, in the province of Cuanza Norte, on 26 December 1963. He studied theology in Brazzaville, Republic of the Congo, and made his first vows as a Spiritan on 5 September 1987. On 28 July 1991, Camuto was ordained to the Catholic priesthood. Subsequently, he undertook studies in social communication at the Salesian Pontifical University in Rome from 2000 until 2003.

== Presbyteral ministry ==
Camuto's first pastoral assignment was to the mission at Landana in the Diocese of Cabinda, where he spent four years. He became rector of the Spiritan preparatory seminary in the then-Diocese of Malanje in 1995, and held that position until 1999, when he was transferred to the Spiritan Scholasticate in Huambo and Benguela.

Camuto served two stints as the director of Radio Ecclesia, a Catholic commercial radio station in Angola; first from 2006 to 2010, and again from 2016 to the present. The radio station is known in Angola as "the voice of the voiceless". It has received criticism for shedding light on human rights abuses in the country and uncovering mismanagement of public resources. In spite of a lack of material supplies and a "huge shortage of sources of information", Camuto was able to ensure that the radio station continued to be independent. This resulted in "tangible changes to government accountability".

Camuto was the provincial superior of the Spiritan Fathers in Angola, serving two terms from 2010 to 2016.

== Episcopal ministry ==
Camuto was appointed Bishop of Caxito on 15 June 2020.
