= Apostolic Prefecture of Cubango in Angola =

Apostolic Prefecture of Cubango
- Apostolic Prefecture of Upper Cimbebasia in Portuguese Angola
- Country: Angola

History
- Founded: 3 July 1879

The Apostolic Prefecture of Cubango in Angola was an exempt Latin Catholic missionary pre-diocesan jurisdiction in present Angola.

== History ==
- Established on 3 July 1879 as Apostolic Prefecture of Cimbebasia, on territory split off from the then Apostolic Vicariate of Two Guineas
- Lost territory in 1881 to establish the Mission sui juris of Cunene
- Renamed on 1 August 1892 as Apostolic Prefecture of Upper Cimbebasia in Portuguese Angola (Curiate Italian: Cimbebasia Superiore), having lost territory to establish the Apostolic Prefecture of Lower Cimbebasia
- Renamed on 10 January 1921 as Apostolic Prefecture of Cubango in Angola
- Suppressed on 4 September 1940, its territory being reassigned to establish the Roman Catholic Diocese of Nova Lisboa, to which its incumbent was promoted as first Bishop.

== Ordinaries ==
Apostolic Prefect of Upper Cimbebasia in Portuguese Angola

- Alfredo Ludovico Keiling, C.S.Sp. (1909.11.16 – 1921.01.10)

Apostolic Prefects of Cubango in Angola

- Alfredo Ludovico Keiling, C.S.Sp. (10 January 1921 – 30 November 1937)
- Daniel Gomes Junqueira, C.S.Sp. (10 June 1938 – 28 January 1941), later first Bishop of Nova Lisboa (Angola) (28 January 1941 – death 29 June 1970)

== See also ==
- Roman Catholicism in Angola

== Sources and external links ==
- GCatholic
