= Alexandre do Nascimento =

Angolan cardinal of the Catholic Church (1925–2024)

His Eminence Alexandre do Nascimento OP
- Cardinal, Archbishop of Luanda
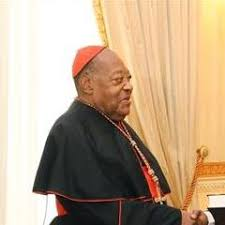
- Nascimento in 2020
- Archdiocese: Luanda
- Appointed: 16 February 1986
- Term ended: 23 January 2001
- Predecessor: Eduardo André Muaca
- Successor: Damião António Franklin
- Other post: Cardinal-Priest of San Marco in Agro Laurentino
- Previous posts: Bishop of Malanje (1975–1977); Archbishop of Lubango (1977–1986)

Orders
- Ordination: 20 December 1952 by Luigi Traglia
- Consecration: 31 August 1975 by Giovanni De Andrea
- Created cardinal: 2 February 1983 by Pope John Paul II
- Rank: Cardinal-Priest

Personal details
- Born: Alexandre do Nascimento; 1 March 1925 Malanje, Portuguese Angola
- Died: 28 September 2024 (aged 99) Luanda, Angola
- Denomination: Roman Catholic
- Education: Pontifical Gregorian University
- Motto: Turres fortissima nomen domini
- Coat of arms

Styles of Alexandre do Nascimento
- Reference style: His Eminence
- Spoken style: Your Eminence
- Informal style: Cardinal
- See: Luanda (emeritus)

Alexandre do Nascimento OP (1 March 1925 – 28 September 2024) was an Angolan Catholic prelate who served as Archbishop of Luanda from 1986 to 2001 and was made a cardinal in 1983. He was a member of the Dominican Order.

== Biography ==
Born in Malanje on 1 March 1925, do Nascimento studied at the seminaries in Banglas, Malanje, and Luanda before travelling to Rome in 1948 to study at the Pontifical Gregorian University, from where he obtained his baccalaureate in philosophy and his licentiate in theology. He was ordained to the priesthood by Archbishop Luigi Traglia on 20 December 1952, and then taught dogmatic theology at the Luanda seminary and served as chief editor of the Catholic newspaper O apostolado ("The apostolate") until 1956, whence he became preacher of the cathedral.

In 1961, with the outbreak of the War of Independence, Nascimento was forced to enter exile in Lisbon. Whilst in Portugal, he did pastoral work, served as a counselor to the Movement of Teams of Our Lady, and studied civil law at the Classical University. Upon returning to Angola in 1971, he taught moral theology at the Pius XII Institute of Social Sciences, and served as an official of the archdiocesan curia of Lubango, secretary general of the Angolan Cáritas, and special assistant to students and former political prisoners.

On 10 August 1975, Nascimento was appointed the fourth bishop of Malanje by Pope Paul VI. He received his episcopal consecration on the following 31 August from Archbishop Giovanni De Andrea, with Archbishops Manuel Nunes Gabriel and Eduardo Muaca serving as co-consecrators. Nascimento was vice-president of the Angolan Episcopal Conference from 1975 to 1981, and was named the third Archbishop of Lubango on 3 February 1977. Archbishop do Nascimento was kidnapped by guerrillas during a pastoral visit on 15 October 1982; he was later freed on 16 November of that same year after Pope John Paul II made an appeal for his release.

John Paul II created him Cardinal-Priest of S. Marco in Agro Laurentino in the consistory of 2 February 1983. He preached the Lenten spiritual exercises for the Pope and members of the Roman Curia in 1984. He was appointed the thirty-fourth Archbishop of Luanda on 16 February 1986 and resigned this post on 23 January 2001.

Nascimento was unable to participate in the 2005 papal conclave because he had just turned 80. He became the oldest living member of the College of Cardinals upon the death of Cardinal Jozef Tomko on 8 August 2022. He is also tied for longest-serving Cardinal with Michael Michai Kitbunchu, both of whom were appointed in 1983.

On 4 June 2015, he made his profession in the Priestly Fraternities of Saint Dominic to the Promoter for the Laity of the Order of Preachers, Rui Carlos Antunes e Almeida Lopes.

Nascimento died on 28 September 2024, at the age of 99.

Catholic Church titles
Preceded by Eduardo André Muaca	Bishop of Malanje; 10 August 1975 – 3 February 1977	Succeeded by Eugénio Salessu
Preceded by Eurico Dias Nogueira	Archbishop of Lubango; 3 February 1977 – 16 February 1986	Succeeded by Manuel Franklin da Costa
Preceded by Eurico Dias Nogueira	Apostolic Administrator of Cunène; 3 February 1977 – 16 February 1986	Succeeded by Fernando Guimarães Kevanu
Preceded by Georg Hüssler	President of Caritas Internationalis; 1983–1991	Succeeded by Affonso Felippe Gregory
Preceded by Emile Biayenda	Cardinal Priest of San Marco in Agro Laurentino; 2 February 1983 – 28 September 2024	Succeeded by Domenico Battaglia
Preceded by Eduardo André Muaca	Archbishop of Luanda; 16 February 1986 – 23 January 2001	Succeeded by Damião António Franklin
Preceded by Manuel Franklin da Costa	President of the Angolan and São Tomé Episcopal Conference; 1990–1997	Succeeded by Zacarias Kamwenho
Records
Preceded by Jozef Tomko	Oldest living cardinal 8 August 2022 – 28 September 2024	Succeeded by Estanislao Esteban Karlic
