= Our Lady of the Assumption Cathedral, Saurimo =

Our Lady of the Assumption Cathedral
- Sé Catedral de Nossa Senhora da Assunção
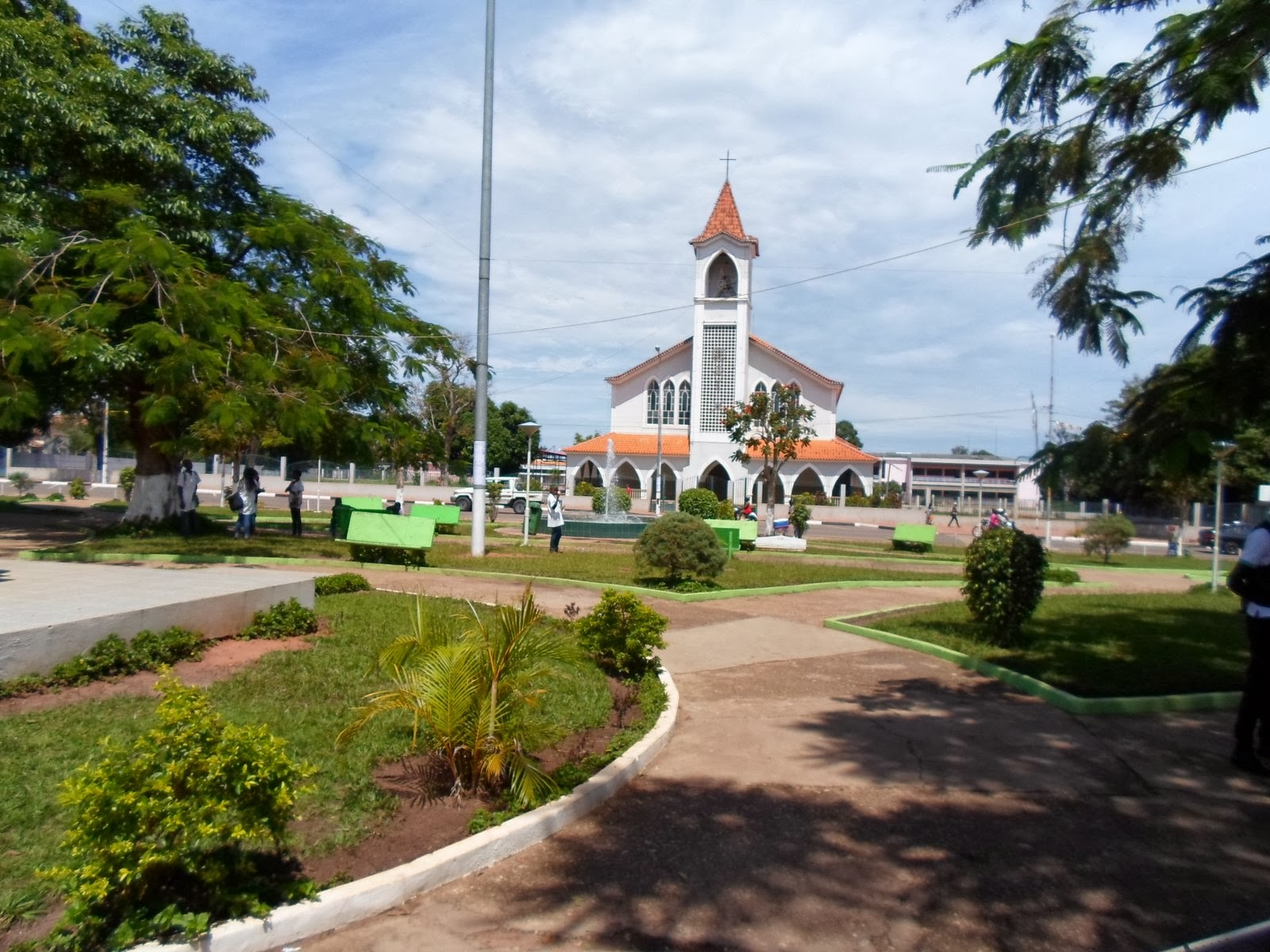
- Our Lady of the Assumption Cathedral
- Location: Saurimo
- Country: Angola
- Denomination: Roman Catholic Church

Administration
- Archdiocese: Roman Catholic Archdiocese of Saurímo

The Our Lady of the Assumption Cathedral (Portuguese: Sé Catedral de Nossa Senhora da Assunção) also called Saurimo Cathedral Is the name given to a religious building affiliated with the Catholic Church which is located in the city of Saurimo in the province of Lunda Sul in the northeast of the African country of Angola.

The current structure was built between 1958 and 1959 and received official blessing only in 1961 when Angola was still a dependency of Portugal.

The cathedral follows the Roman or Latin rite and is the main or mother church of the Metropolitan Archdiocese of Saurimo (Archidioecesis Saurimoënsis) which was created as a diocese by Pope Paul VI in 1975 and was elevated to its current status in 2011 through the bull "Quandoquidem accepimus "of Pope Benedict XVI.

It is under the pastoral responsibility of Bishop José Manuel Imbamba.

== See also ==
- Roman Catholicism in Angola
- List of cathedrals in Angola
- Luanda Cathedral
