= Our Lady of the Conception Cathedral =

Our Lady of the Conception Cathedral may refer to:

- Our Lady of the Conception Cathedral, Abaetetuba, Pará, Brazil
- Our Lady of the Conception Cathedral, Aracaju, Sergipe, Brazil
- Our Lady of the Conception Cathedral, Campinas, São Paulo, Brazil
- Our Lady of the Conception Cathedral, Guarulhos, São Paulo, Brazil
- Our Lady of the Conception Cathedral, Sumbe, Cuanza Sul, Angola

== See also ==
- Cathedral of the Immaculate Conception (disambiguation)
