= Luis María Pérez de Onraíta =

Spanish Roman Catholic bishop

Luis María Pérez de Onraita Aguirre
- Archbishop of Malanje
- Native name: Luis Maria Perez de Onraita Agirre
- Church: Catholic Church
- Archdiocese: Archdiocese of Malanje
- In office: 27 August 1998 – 19 May 2012
- Predecessor: Eugénio Salessu
- Successor: Benedito Roberto
- Previous post: Coadjutor Bishop of Malanje (1995-1998)

Orders
- Ordination: 11 August 1957
- Consecration: 10 March 1996 by Félix del Blanco Prieto

Personal details
- Born: 12 April 1933 Gauna, Álava, Spanish Republic
- Died: 3 April 2015 (aged 81)

Luis María Pérez de Onraita Aguirre (12 April 1933 – 3 April 2015) was a Spanish Roman Catholic bishop who served in Angola.

He was born in Gauna, Álava, Spain and ordained a priest in 1957. He was named the coadjutor bishop of Malanje, Angola in 1996 and retired in 2012 as archbishop.
