= Episcopal Conference of Angola and São Tomé =

Assembly of Catholic bishops in southwest Africa

Episcopal Conference of Angola and São Tomé Portuguese: Conferência Episcopal de Angola e São Tomé
- Location: Luanda, Angola (headquarters)
- Type: Religious conference

The Episcopal Conference of Angola and São Tomé (Conferência Episcopal de Angola e São Tomé or CEAST) is the Catholic Bishops' Conference of Angola and São Tomé and Principe. It has its headquarters in Luanda. In its pastoral letters, CEAST calls repeatedly for dialogue and social justice.

== Leadership ==
The organization has been headed by:

- Manuel Nuñes Gabriel, Archbishop of Luanda (1967–1975)
- Eduardo André Muaca, Archbishop of Luanda (1975–1982)
- Manuel Franklin da Costa, Archbishop of Lubango (1982–1990)
- Cardinal Alexandre do Nascimento, Archbishop of Luanda (1990–1997)
- Zacarias Kamwenho, Archbishop of Lubango (1997–2003)
- Damião António Franklin, Archbishop of Luanda (2003–2009)
- Gabriel Mbilingi, CSSp, Archbishop of Lubango (2009–2015)
- Filomeno do Nascimento Vieira Dias, Archbishop of Luanda (2015–2021)
- José Manuel Imbamba, Archbishop of Saurimo (2021–present)

== See also ==
- Roman Catholicism in Angola
- Roman Catholic Diocese of São Tomé and Príncipe
