= Our Lady of Fatima Cathedral, Benguela =

Coordinates: 14.66101932784008°S 17.687613914676497°E

Our Lady of Fatima Cathedral
- Sé Catedral de Nossa Senhora de Fátima
- Our Lady of Fatima Cathedral
- Location: Benguela
- Country: Angola
- Denomination: Roman Catholic Church

The Our Lady of Fatima Cathedral (Portuguese: Sé Catedral de Nossa Senhora de Fátima) or simply Cathedral of Benguela is a religious building of the Catholic Church which is in Benguela, in the African country of Angola and serves as the cathedral of the Diocese of Benguela.

The church of Our Lady of Fatima has replaced the old church of the same name in 1963 and was elevated to the status of cathedral diocese in 1970. The construction was supervised by Pastor Teixeira Neves, with the design of Mario de Oliveira, inspired in the cathedral of Sumbe. The church is the largest in the city parish and is a rectangular concrete building floor, covered with a steep roof.

== See also ==
- Roman Catholic Diocese of Benguela
- Roman Catholicism in Angola
- Our Lady of Fatima Church
