= Pedro Marcos Ribeiro da Costa =

- Bishop of Saurímo
- Church: Catholic Church
- Diocese: Diocese of Saurímo
- In office: 3 February 1977 – 15 January 1997
- Predecessor: Manuel Franklin da Costa
- Successor: Eugenio Dal Corso

Orders
- Ordination: 23 January 1949
- Consecration: 20 March 1977 by Giovanni De Andrea

Personal details
- Born: 21 October 1921
- Died: 2 September 2010 (aged 88)

Pedro Marcos Ribeiro da Costa (21 October 1921 – 2 September 2010) was the Angolan bishop of the Roman Catholic Diocese of Saurimo from his appointment on 3 February 1977, until his retirement on 15 January 1997. He also remained the bishop emeritus of the Diocese of Saurimo until his death in 2010.

Tomás Pedro Barbosa da Silva Nunes was born in Cajikole on 21 October 1921. He died on 2 September 2010, at the age of 88.
