= Zacarias Kamwenho =

Angolan Roman Catholic archbishop and peace activist (1934–2026)

The Most Reverend Zacarias Kamwenho
- Archbishop Emeritus of Lubango
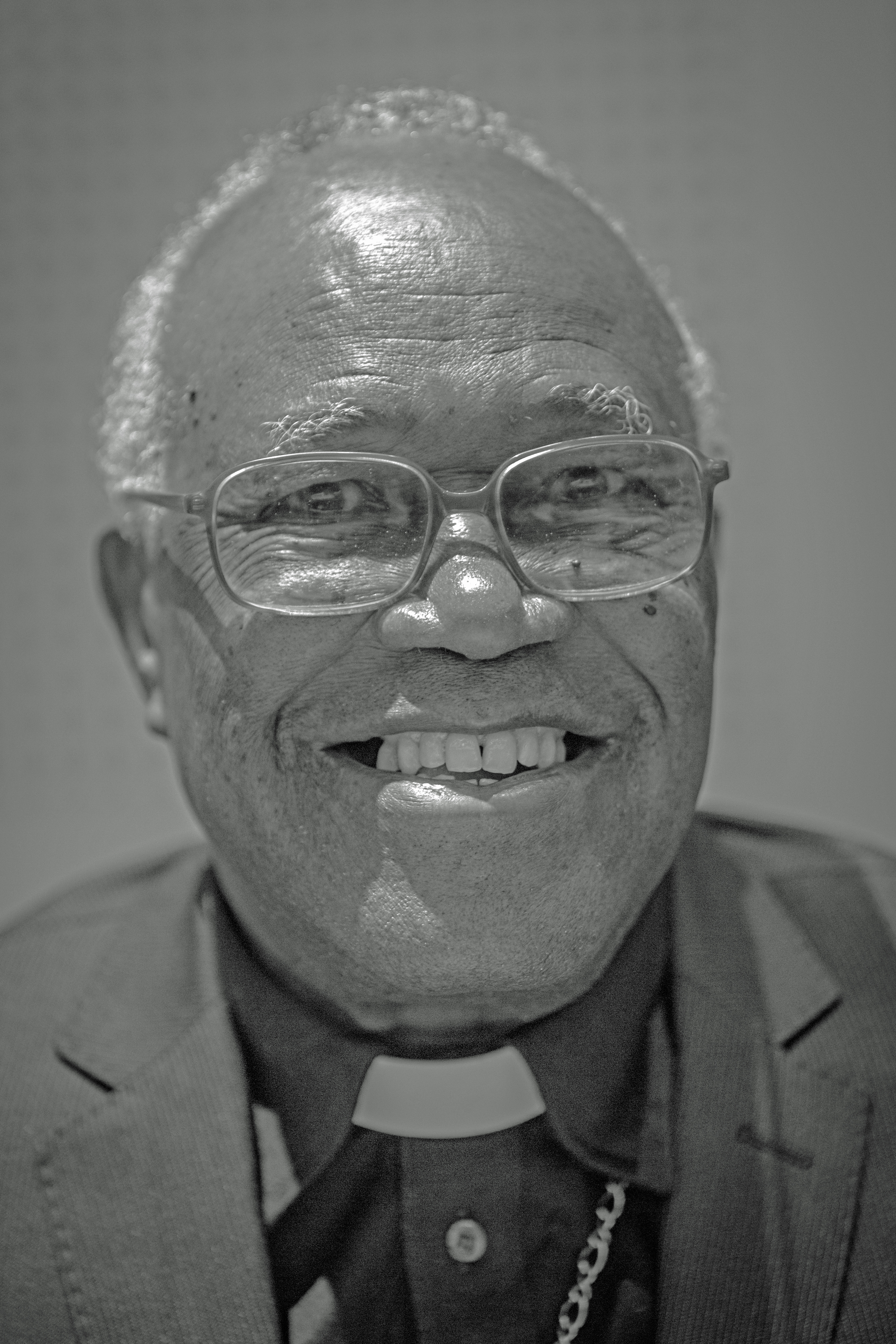
- Kamwenho in 2013
- Archdiocese: Lubango
- Installed: 15 January 1997
- Term ended: 5 September 2009
- Predecessor: Manuel Franklin da Costa
- Successor: Gabriel Mbilingi
- Previous posts: Auxiliary Bishop of Luanda and Titular Bishop of Tabla (1974–1975); Bishop of Novo Redondo (1975–1995); Coadjutor Archbishop of Lubango (1995–1997)

Orders
- Ordination: 9 July 1961
- Consecration: 23 November 1974 by Américo Henriques, Manuel Nunes Gabriel and Eduardo André Muaca

Personal details
- Born: 5 September 1934 Chimbundo, Huambo, Portuguese Angola
- Died: 29 May 2026 (aged 91) Luanda, Angola
- Denomination: Roman Catholic

Styles of Zacarias Kamwenho
- Reference style: The Most Reverend
- Spoken style: Your Excellency
- Religious style: Monsignor
- Posthumous style: none

Zacarias Kamwenho (5 September 1934 – 29 May 2026) was an Angolan Roman Catholic archbishop and peace activist. He had an important role in the peace process that led to the end of the Angolan Civil War in 2002.

== Biography ==
Kamwenho was ordained a priest in 1961 and afterwards nominated a teacher at Bela Vista Mission, in Nova Lisboa, now Huambo, where he worked for eight years, being nominated vice-rector in 1970. He was afterwards nominated rector of the Major Seminary of Christ the King in Nova Lisboa, accumulating functions with vicar general of the Diocese of Nova Lisboa, since 26 August 1974. He was made coadjutor bishop of the Roman Catholic Archdiocese of Luanda on 23 November 1974. He became titular bishop of the Diocese of Novo Redondo, now Sumbe, on 10 August 1975. He was nominated coadjutor bishop, with right to succession, of the Archbishop of Lubango on 12 November 1995, becoming Archbishop on 15 January 1997 and assuming office on 2 February 1997. He retired after reaching the age of 75 years on 5 September 2009.

He chaired the Episcopal Conference of Angola and São Tomé (CEAST) and the Ecumenical Committee for Peace in Angola (COIEPA), which was established in April 2000 and brings together the Catholic CEAST, the Angolan Evangelical Alliance (AEA) and the Council of Christian Churches in Angola (CICA).

In 2001 he acted as mediator in the Angolan Civil War between MPLA and UNITA. For his role in the peace process he was named co-winner of the Sakharov Prize for Freedom of Thought by the European Parliament in 2001.

Kamwenho died on 29 May 2026, at the age of 91.

Catholic Church titles
Preceded by Manuel Franklin da Costa	Archbishop of Lubango; 1997–2009	Succeeded by Gabriel Mbilingi
Preceded by —	Coadjutor Archbishop of Lubango; 1995–1997	Succeeded by —
Preceded by Position established	Bishop of Novo Rodendo; 1975–1995	Succeeded by Benedito Roberto
Preceded by Henry Joseph Grimmelsman	Titular Bishop of Tabla; 1974–1975	Succeeded by Oriano Quilici
Preceded by —	Auxiliary Bishop of Luanda; 1974–1975	Succeeded by —
