= Armando Amaral dos Santos =

Armando Amaral dos Santos (4 March 1929 in Chinguar – 14 October 1973) was an Angolan clergyman and bishop for the Roman Catholic Diocese of Benguela. He became ordained in 1956. He was appointed bishop in 1970. He died on 14 October 1973, at the age of 44.
