= Luzizila Kiala =

Angolan prelate

The Most Reverend Luzizila Kiala
- Archbishop of Malanje
- Church: Roman Catholic Church
- Diocese: Malanje
- See: Malanje
- In office: 29 September 2021
- Predecessor: Benedito Roberto
- Other post: Bishop of Sumbe (2013–2021)

Orders
- Ordination: 23 August 1992
- Consecration: 25 August 2013 by Emílio Sumbelelo

Personal details
- Born: Luzizila Kiala; 19 November 1963 (age 62) Damba, Uíge Province, Angola

Luzizila Kiala (born 19 November 1963) is an Angolan prelate with the Catholic Church who is currently the archbishop the archdiocese of Malanje.

== Biography ==
Kiala was born on 19 November 1963 in Damba, in Uíge Province. After completing his primary and secondary studies, he was admitted to the Seminary of São Paulo, in Uíge, where he graduated in philosophy. He completed his studies in theology from the Seminário Maior de Cristo Rei in Huambo. On 23 August 1992, he was ordained a priest in his home city.

Until 1994, he was the parish priest in Songo, Bembe, and Caipemba. Afterwards, he was the external spiritual director of the Seminary of Uíge, a position he held until 1997, when he went to study at Pontifical Gregorian University, where he obtained his doctorate in spiritual theology. After returning to Angola in 2001, he became the parochial vicar of Bembe, a member of the Presbyteral council, a member of both the College of Consultors and the Council of Economic Relations, and resident spiritual director of the Seminary of Uíge. He also became a vicar forane, the president of the diocesan commission on emigrants, of the liturgy and sacred music, and the episcopal vicar and professor at the seminary. In 2008, he went on to take on the functions of vicar general of the diocese of Uíge, the parochial vicar of the Cathedral Church and ecclesiastic assistant of the Associação Cristã de Gestores e Dirigentes (ACGD) of the diocese of Uíge.

Kiala was named the bishop of Sumbe on 21 May 2013 by Pope Francis, being consecrated in 25 August of that same year at the Estádio 4 de Janeiro by Dom Emílio Sumbelelo, bishop of Uíge, who was assisted by Dom Almeida Canda, bishop of Nadalatando and by Dom Vicente Carlos Kiaziku, O.F.M. Cap., bishop of Mbanza Congo. He made his entrance into the cathedral in 8 September of that year.

On 29 September 2021, he was elevated to the post of metropolitan archbishop of Malanje. He took the position on 14 November of that year.
