= Pedro Luís Guido Scarpa =

Angolan Roman Catholic bishop

Pedro Luís Guido Scarpa OFMCap
- Bishop of Ndalatando
- Church: Catholic Church
- Diocese: Diocese of Ndalatando
- In office: 26 March 1990 – 23 July 2005
- Predecessor: Diocese erected
- Successor: Almeida Kanda
- Previous posts: Titular Bishop of Cursola (1983-1990); Auxiliary Bishop of Luanda (1983-1990)

Orders
- Ordination: 26 March 1950
- Consecration: 16 October 1983 by Eduardo André Muaca

Personal details
- Born: 7 February 1925 Venice, Province of Venice, Kingdom of Italy
- Died: 20 October 2018 (aged 93) Luanda, Angola

Pedro Luís Guido Scarpa (7 February 1925 – 20 October 2018) was an Italian Catholic bishop who served in Angola.

== Biography ==
Scarpa was born in Italy and was ordained to the priesthood on 26 March 1950. He served as titular bishop of Korčula' and as auxiliary bishop of the Roman Catholic Archdiocese of Luanda, Angola from 1983 to 1990. He then served as bishop of the Roman Catholic Diocese of Ndalatando, Angola, from 1990 to 2005. Scarpa died on 20 October 2018 at the age of 93.
