= Lugo di Valpantena =

- Frazione
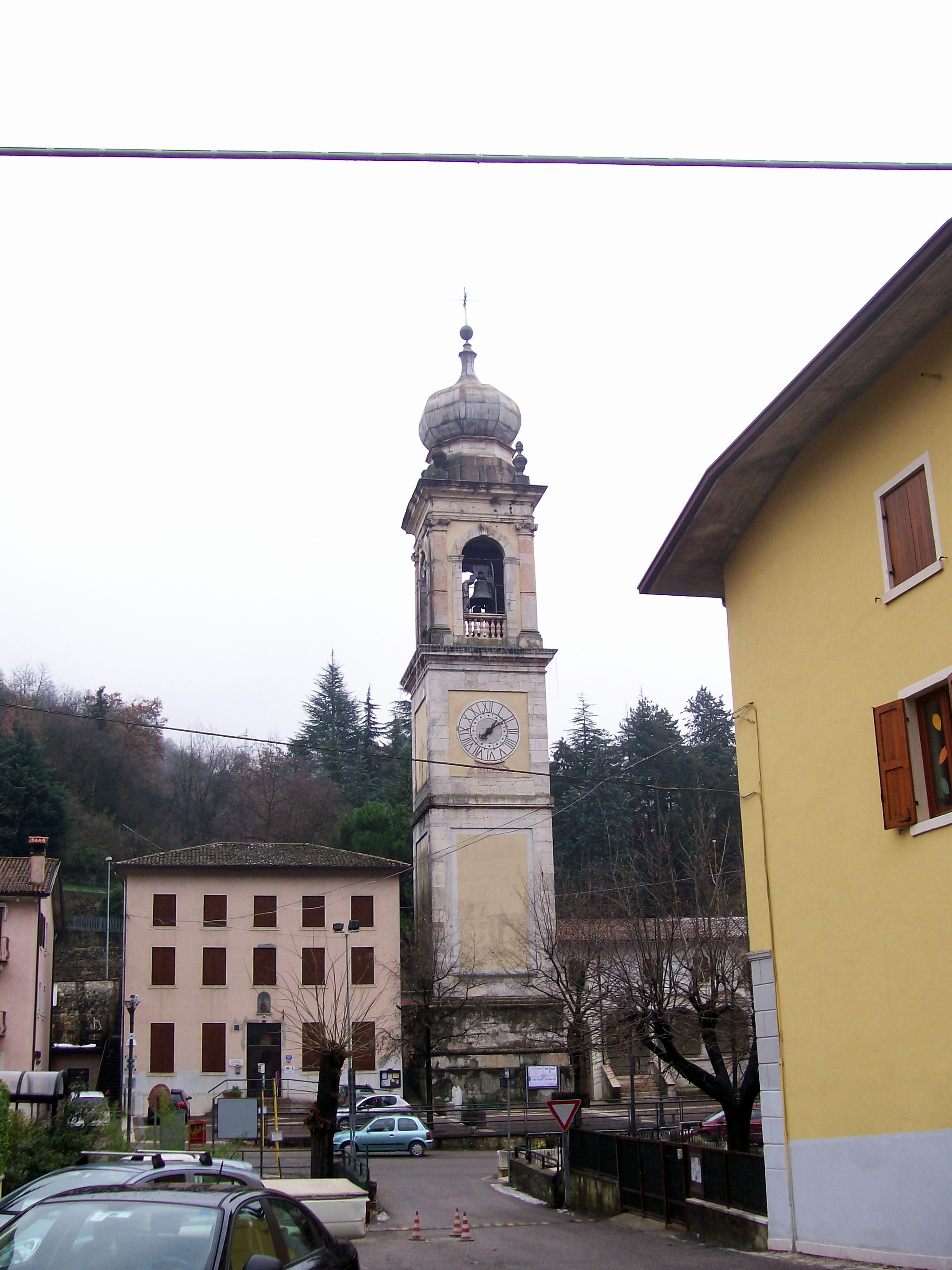
- Interactive map of Lugo di Valpantena
- Coordinates: 45°30′20″N 10°59′32″E
- Country: Italy
- Region: Veneto
- Comune: Verona

Lugo di Valpantena is a village in the province of Verona in Italy. It is a frazione of the comune of Grezzana.

== Geography ==
The village, located in the upper Valpantena, lies approximately 6 kilometers north of Grezzana and 15 kilometers from Verona. It is situated along the provincial road SP14, known as the "Alta Valpantena Road," which connects the valley to the localities of upper Lessinia. Just north of Lugo, the Valpantena splits into three deep ravines: the Vajo della Marciora, the Vajo dei Falconi, and the Vajo dell'Anguilla. Surrounding these ravines are significant peaks such as Corno d'Aquilio, Corno Mozzo, and Monte Tomba.

== Main sights ==
- The parish church is dedicated to Sant'Apollinare (ninth century)
- The oratory of Corso is dedicated to Saint Paul (1685)

== Notable people ==
- Eugenio Dal Corso, (1939 – 2024) bishop of Lodi, born in Marne
