= Archdiocese of Huambo =

Roman Catholic archdiocese in western Angola

Coordinates: 12.7703°S 15.7396°E

Archdiocese of Huambo Archidioecesis Huambensis

Location
- Country: Angola

Statistics
- Population: Total; Catholics: (as of 2019); 2,019,555; 1,137,010 (56.3%)
- Parishes: 49

Information
- Denomination: Roman Catholic
- Rite: Latin Rite
- Established: 4 September 1940 (As Diocese of Nova Lisboa); 3 February 1977 (As Archdiocese of Huambo)
- Cathedral: Marian Cathedral of the Conception of Our Lady
- Secular priests: 88 (2019)

Current leadership
- Pope: Leo XIV
- Archbishop: Zeferino Zeca Martins, S.V.D.
- Bishops emeritus: José de Queirós Alves, C.SS.R.

The Archdiocese of Huambo (Latin: Archidioecesis Huambensis) is a Latin Metropolitan archdiocese of the Roman Catholic Church in western Angola.

The cathedral see of the archbishop is the Marian Cathedral of the Conception of Our Lady (Portuguese: Sé Catedral de Nossa Senhora da Conceição), in Huambo.

By 2019, the archdiocese had approximately 1.1 million Roman Catholics and 88 diocesan priests.

== History ==
On 4 September 1940, the Diocese of Nova Lisboa was established on assembled territories split off from the Diocese of São Paulo de Loanda and mission sui iuris of Cunene, mainly to serve the growing European population in what was then the colony of Portuguese Angola.

As time went on, it shed territory due to the creation of other dioceses :

- on 27 July 1955 to establish the then Diocese of Sá da Bandeira (now the Archiocese of Lubango)
- on 6 June on 1970 to establish its future suffragan diocese, the Diocese of Benguela
- on 10 October 1975 to establish the Diocese of Serpa Pinto (later renamed the Diocese of Menongue) and the Diocese of Pereira de Eça (later renamed the Diocese of Ondjiva).

On 3 February 1977, the Diocese of Nova Lisboa was promoted and renamed the Metropolitan Archdiocese of Huambo.

In June 1992, it enjoyed a Papal visit from Pope John Paul II.

== Geography ==
The archdiocese has an area of 35,770 square kilometers and comprises most of Huambo Province, including the following municipalities:

- Huambo
- Bailundo
- Ekunha
- Caála
- Katchiungo
- Londuimbali
- Longonjo
- Mungo
- Tchicala Tcholohanga
- Ucuma

== Bishops ==
(all Roman Rite) † = deceased

=== Episcopal ordinaries ===
Suffragan Bishops of Nova Lisboa

- † Daniel Gomes Junqueira (C.S.Sp.) (28 January 1941 – death 29 June 1970), previously Apostolic Prefect of Cubango in Angola (Angola) (1938 – 28 January 1941)
- † Américo Henriques (19 February 1972 – 13 April 1976, died 2006); previously Titular Bishop of Tisili (3 July 1966– 2 February 1971) & Auxiliary Bishop of Lamego (Portugal) (3 July 1966– 15 April 1967), promoted to Coadjutor Bishop of Lamego (15 April 1967 – 2 February 1971) and succeeded as Bishop of Lamego (2 February 1971 – 19 February 1972)

Metropolitan Archbishops of Huambo

- † Manuel Franklin da Costa (3 February 1977 – 12 September 1986), also President of Episcopal Conference of Angola and São Tomé (1982 – 1990); previously Bishop of Henrique de Carvalho (Angola) (10 August 1975– 3 February 1977); later Metropolitan Archbishop of Lubango (Angola) (12 September 1986 – retired 15 January 1997, died 2003)
- † Francisco Viti 12 September 1986 – retired 31 July 2003); previously Bishop of Serpa Pinto (now Menongue; Angola) (10 August 1975– 16 May 1979), restyled Bishop of Menongue (Angola) (16 May 1979– 12 September 1986)
- † Apostolic Administrator Oscar Lino Lopes Fernandes Braga (31 July 2003 – 3 May 2004), while Bishop of suffragan see Benguela (Angola) (20 November 1974– 18 February 2008)
- José de Queirós Alves, C.SS.R. (3 May 2004 – 1 October 2018), former Bishop of Menongue (Angola) (12 September 1986– 3 May 2004), also stayed Apostolic Administrator of his former see Menongue (27 June 2004– 3 August 2005)
- Zeferino Zeca Martins, S.V.D. (1 October 2018 - ...), previously Auxiliary Bishop of Luanda (19 May 2012 - 1 October 2018)

=== Other priests of the Archdiocese who became bishops ===
- † Mateus Feliciano Augusto Tomás (Bishop of the Diocese of Namibe, 21 March 2009 – 30 October 2010)

== Province ==
Its ecclesiastical province comprises the Metropolitan's archdiocese and the following suffragan sees:

- Roman Catholic Diocese of Benguela
- Roman Catholic Diocese of Ganda
- Roman Catholic Diocese of Kwito-Bié

== Demographics ==
The diocese has a population of approximately 2,456,000, most of whom are Ovimbundu or Ganguela. The most common spoken languages are Umbundu and Portuguese.

Statistics
Year	Population			Priests				Permanent Deacons	Religious		Parishes
Year	Catholics	Total	%	Diocesan	Religious	Total Priests	Catholics per Priest	Permanent Deacons	Male	Female	Parishes
1950	394,621	1,284,668	30.7	13	102	115	3,431	-	114	98	37
1966	754,765	1,327,913	56.8	69	97	166	4,546	-	145	185	59
1970	880,000	1,670,000	52.7	86	79	165	5,333	-	136	204	29
1980	767,000	1,330,000	57.7	27	22	49	15,653	-	60	56	34
1990	1,088,004	1,750,000	62.2	30	23	53	20,528	-	102	134	55
1999	1,000,000	2,890,000	34.6	27	22	49	20,408	-	209	165	42
2000	1,290,000	2,336,211	55.2	32	21	53	24,339	-	174	156	20
2001	1,170,00	2,072,586	56.5	39	23	62	18,870	-	132	152	20
2002	1,119,590	2,012,180	55.6	41	26	67	16,710	-	114	158	20
2003	1,056,000	1,956,000	54.0	43	22	65	16,246	-	130	170	20
2004	1,120,000	1,956,000	57.3	51	20	71	15,774	-	119	173	42
2006	1,278,000	2,083,000	61.4	57	20	77	16,597	-	85	150	42
2013	1,552,000	2,530,000	61.3	74	21	95	16,336	-	99	179	43
2016	1,635,000	2,667,000	61.3	81	23	104	15,721	-	127	177	43
2019	1,137,010	2,019,555	56.3	88	28	116	9,801	-	156	196	49

== See also ==
- List of Roman Catholic dioceses in Angola

== Source and External links ==
- GCatholic.org, with incumbent biography links
