= Benedito Roberto =

Angolan Roman Catholic archbishop (1946–2020)

Benedito Roberto C.S.Sp.
- Archbishop of Malanje
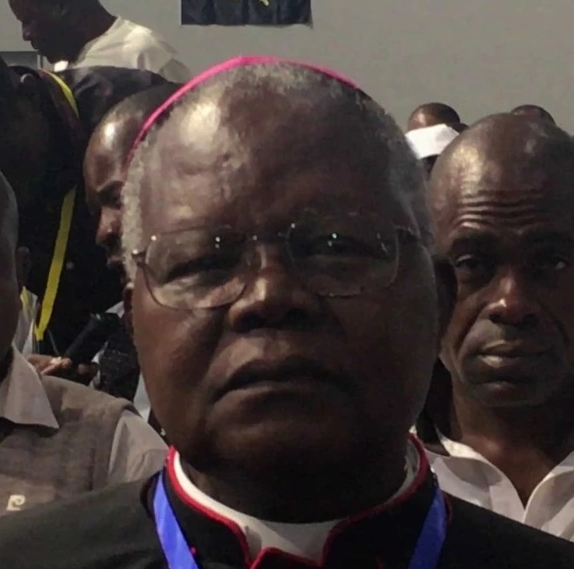
- Church: Catholic Church
- Archdiocese: Archdiocese of Malanje
- In office: 19 May 2012 – 8 November 2020
- Predecessor: Luis María Pérez de Onraíta
- Successor: Luzizila Kiala
- Previous posts: Bishop of Sumbe (2006-2012); Bishop of Novo Redondo (1995-2006)

Orders
- Ordination: 18 October 1981
- Consecration: 25 February 1996 by Félix del Blanco Prieto

Personal details
- Born: 5 November 1946 Mussende, Province of Angola, Portuguese Empire
- Died: 8 November 2020 (aged 74) Malanje, Malanje Province, Angola

Benedito Roberto (5 November 1946 in Mussende – 8 November 2020 in Malanje) was an Angolan Roman Catholic archbishop.

Roberto was born in Angola and was ordained to priesthood in 1981. He served as a bishop in the Roman Catholic Diocese of Novo Redondo, Angola, from 1995 to 2006. The diocese was renamed as the Roman Catholic Diocese of Sumbe in 2006 and Roberto continued to serve as a bishop of the diocese. Roberto then served as an archbishop of the Roman Catholic Archdiocese of Malanje, Angola, from 2012 until his death.
