= Eugénio Salessu =

Angolan bishop

- Bishop of Malanje
- Church: Catholic Church
- Diocese: Diocese of Malanje
- In office: 3 February 1977 – 27 August 1998
- Predecessor: Alexandre do Nascimento
- Successor: Luis María Pérez de Onraíta

Orders
- Ordination: 14 July 1957
- Consecration: 6 March 1977 by Giovanni De Andrea

Personal details
- Born: 27 August 1923
- Died: 20 January 2011 (aged 87)

Eugénio Salessu (23 August 1923 – 20 January 2011) was the Catholic bishop of the Roman Catholic Diocese of Malanje, Angola.

Ordained to the priesthood in 1957, Salessu was appointed bishop of the Malanje Diocese in 1977. Bishop Salessu retired in 1998 and died on 20 January 2011.
