= Gabriel Mbilingi =

Angolan Archbishop of Lubango

The Most Reverend Gabriel Mbilingi C.S.Sp.
- Archbishop of Lubango
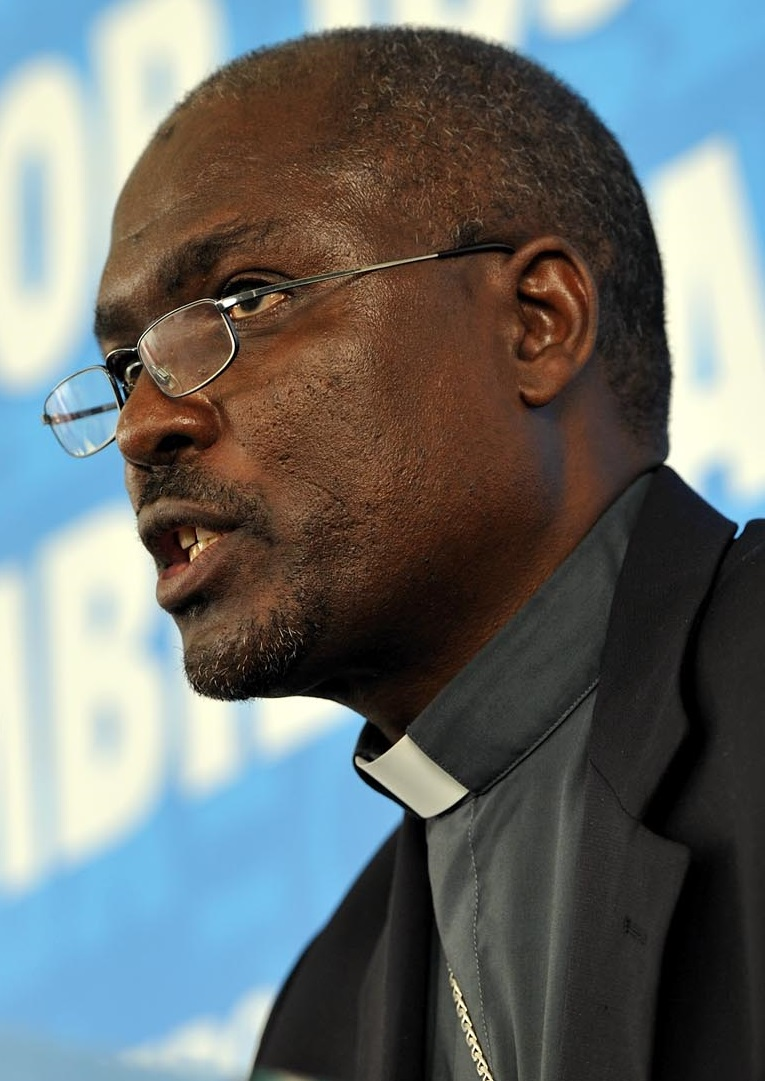
- Mbilingi in Rio de Janeiro in 2012.
- Church: Roman Catholic Church
- Archdiocese: Lubango
- See: Lubango
- Appointed: 5 September 2009
- Predecessor: Zacarias Kamwenho
- Previous posts: Coadjutor Bishop of Luena (1999-2000); Bishop of Luena (2000-06); Coadjutor Archbishop of Lubango (2006-09); President of the Inter-Regional Meeting of Bishops of Southern Africa (2007-12); President of the Episcopal Conference of Angola and São Tomé (2009-15); President of the Symposium of Episcopal Conferences of Africa and Madagascar (2013-19)

Orders
- Ordination: 26 February 1984
- Consecration: 6 January 2000 by Pope John Paul II

Personal details
- Born: Gabriel Mbilingi; 17 January 1958 (age 68) Bândua, Bié, Angola
- Motto: Et passio Christi

Gabriel Mbilingi C.S.Sp., (born 17 January 1958 in Bândua, Bié, Angola) is the current Angolan Archbishop of Lubango. Since 20 November 2009 he is the president of the Episcopal Conference of Angola and São Tomé and Príncipe, or CEAST (Conferencia Episcopal de Angola e São Tomé e Príncipe).

== Life ==
On February 26, 1984, Gabriel Mbilingi joined the Congregation of the Spiritan (Latin: Congregatio Sancti Spiritus; CSSp) and received the ordination. On 15 October 1999 he was appointed by Pope John Paul II as Coadjutor bishop of the Diocese of Lwena; on 6 January 2000 the Pope himself consecrated him as bishop. Later he followed the resignation of his predecessor, José da Próspero Ascensao Puaty as Bishop of Lwena in the Huambo Province. In 2006 he was appointed Coadjutor bishop of the Archdiocese of Lubango.

On 22 July 2007 the General assembly of the Bishops' Conference for Southern Africa in Luanda, elected him as the new President of the Inter-Regional Meeting of Bishops of Southern Africa (IMBISA).

With the resignation of Archbishop Zacarias Kamwenho on 6 September 2009 he became the new Archbishop of Lubango. On 29 June 2010, he was received as the new Metropolitan of the Ecclesiastical Province of Lubango in St. Peter's Basilica the pallium from Pope Benedict XVI.
