= Gauna, Álava =

Hamlet in Álava, Spain

Gauna
- Concejo
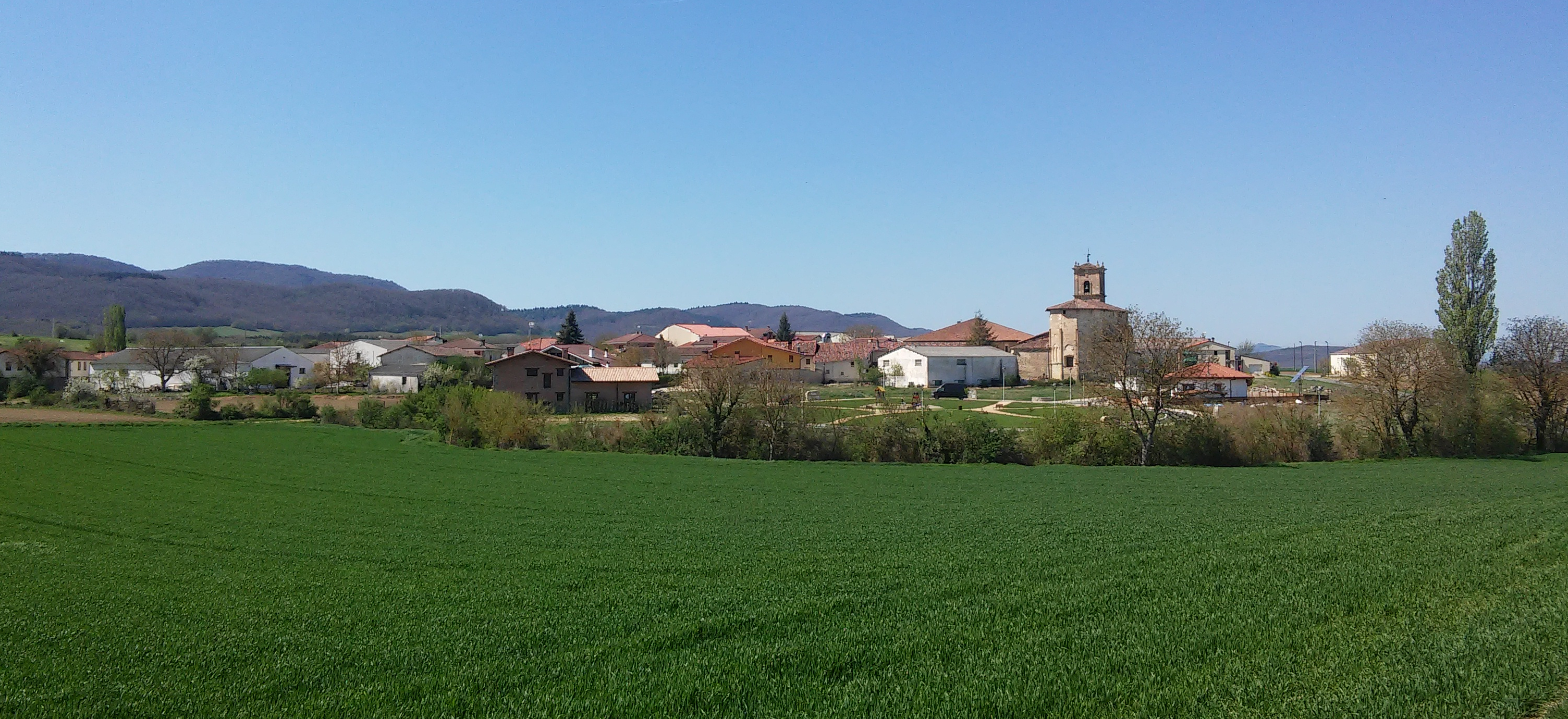
- View of Gauna

- Location within Álava Location within the Basque Country Location within Spain
- Coordinates: 42°49′29″N 2°29′46″W
- Country: Spain
- Autonomous community: Basque Country
- Province: Álava
- Comarca: Llanada Alavesa
- Municipality: Iruraiz-Gauna

Area
  - Total: 5.96 km^{2} (2.30 sq mi)
- Elevation: 599 m (1,965 ft)

Population (2023)
  - Total: 73
  - Density: 12/km^{2} (32/sq mi)
- Postal code: 01193

Gauna is a hamlet and concejo in the municipality of Iruraiz-Gauna, in Álava province, Basque Country, Spain.
