= Diocese of Benguela =

Roman Catholic diocese in Angola

Coordinates: 12.5858°S 13.4025°E

Diocese of Benguela Dioecesis Benguelensis

Location
- Country: Angola
- Metropolitan: Huambo

Statistics
- Population: Total; Catholics: (as of 2020); 2,551,000; 1,985,760 (77.8%)
- Parishes: 68

Information
- Denomination: Roman Catholic
- Rite: Latin Rite
- Established: 6 June 1970
- Cathedral: Our Lady of Fatima Cathedral, Benguela
- Patron saint: Our Lady of Fatima
- Secular priests: 172 (2020)

Current leadership
- Pope: Leo XIV
- Bishop: António Francisco Jaca

The Roman Catholic Diocese of Benguela (Latin: Dioecesis Benguelensis) is a diocese located in the city of Benguela in the ecclesiastical province of Huambo in Angola. The current bishop of the diocese is António Francisco Jaca.

== History ==
The diocese was established on 6 June 1970 as Diocese of Benguela from the Diocese of Nova Lisboa (now the Archdiocese of Huambo). It was initially a suffragan of the Archdiocese of Luanda but became a suffragan of Huambo on 3 February 1977.

It enjoyed a papal visit by Pope John Paul II on 9 June 1992.

== Geography ==
The diocese covers the entirety of Benguela Province. It has an area of 39,823 km^{2} and is divided into 68 parishes.

== Special churches ==
The Cathedral of the diocese is Our Lady of Fatima Cathedral (Portuguese: Sé Catedral de Nossa Senhora de Fátima) in Benguela.

== Bishops ==
=== Bishops of Benguela ===
- Armando Amaral dos Santos (6 June 1970 – 14 October 1973)
- Oscar Lino Lopes Fernandes Braga (20 November 1974 – 18 February 2008)
- Eugenio Dal Corso, PSDP (18 February 2008 – 26 March 2018), elevated to Cardinal in 2019
- António Francisco Jaca, SVD (26 March 2018 – present)

=== Auxiliary Bishops ===
- Estêvão Binga (3 November 2021–1 August 2024). Appointed Bishop of Ganda, Angola

=== Other priests of this diocese who became bishops ===
- Mário Lucunde, appointed Bishop of Menongue in 2005
- Emílio Sumbelelo, appointed Coadjutor Bishop of Uije in 2006

== See also ==
- Roman Catholicism in Angola
