= Conception of Our Lady =

Order of nuns

Conception of Our Lady is an order of nuns founded in Portugal in 1484. They at first followed the rule of the Cistercians, but afterwards that of St. Clare.
