= Diocese of Sumbe =

Roman Catholic diocese in Angola

Coordinates: 11.2017°S 13.8358°E

Diocese of Sumbe Dioecesis Sumbensis
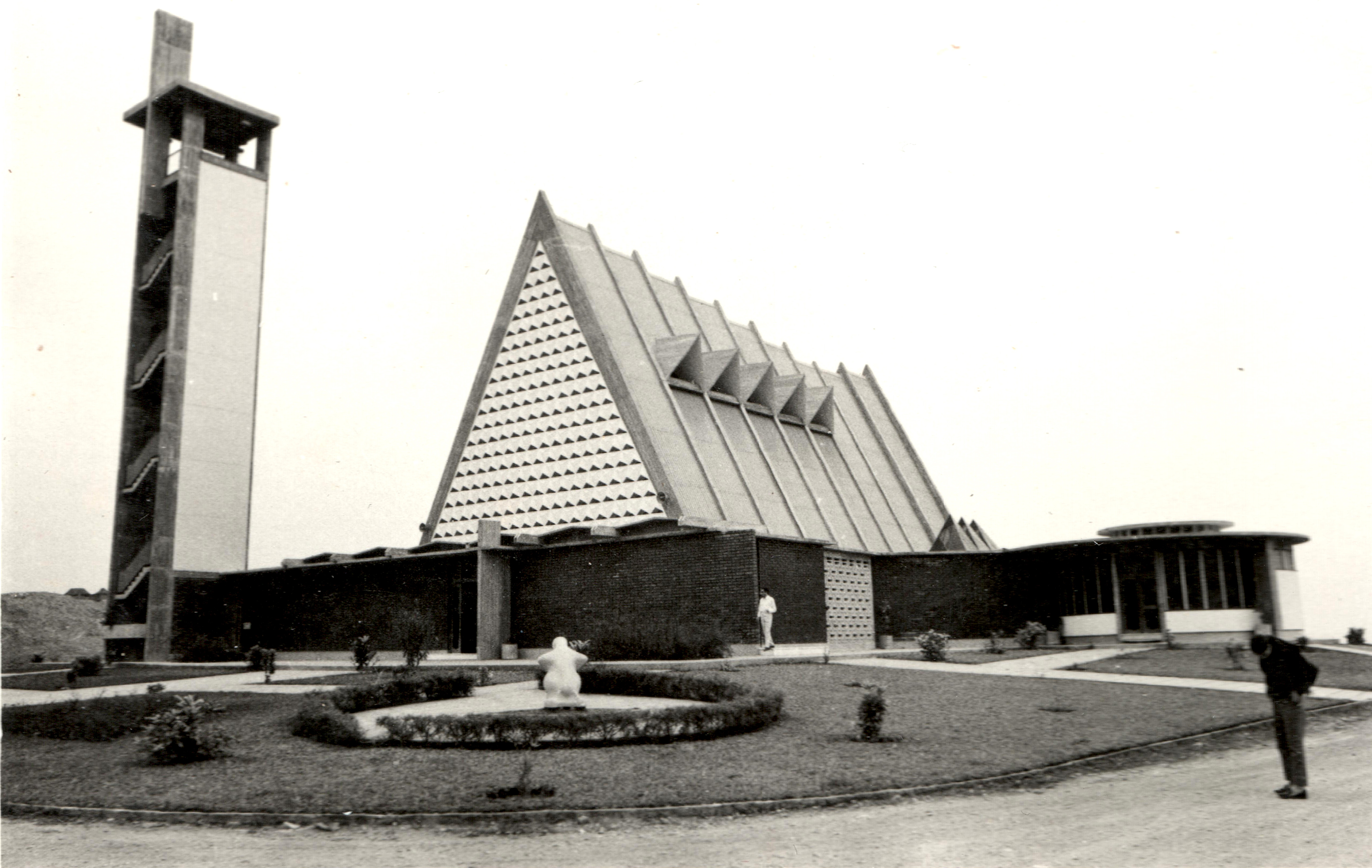
- Our Lady of the Conception Cathedral, ca. 1970

Location
- Country: Angola

Statistics
- Area: 58,698 km^{2} (22,663 sq mi)
- Population: Total; Catholics: 1,941,500; 649,022 (33.4%)
- Parishes: 22

Information
- Denomination: Catholicism
- Sui iuris church: Latin Church
- Rite: Roman
- Established: August 10, 1975
- Cathedral: Our Lady of the Conception Cathedral
- Secular priests: 49

Current leadership
- Bishop: Firmino David

Map
- Location of Cuanza Sul Province, headquarters of the diocese, within Angola

The Roman Catholic Diocese of Sumbe (Latin: Dioecesis Sumbensis) is a diocese located in the city of Sumbe in the ecclesiastical province of Luanda in Angola.

== History ==
- 10 August 1975: Established as Diocese of Ngunza from the Metropolitan Archdiocese of Luanda
- 3 February 1977: Renamed as Diocese of Novo Redondo
- 22 October 2006: Renamed as Diocese of Sumbe

== Special churches ==
The Cathedral of the diocese is Sé Catedral de Nossa Senhora da Conceição (Our Lady of the Conception Cathedral) in Sumbe.

== Bishops ==
=== Ordinaries, in reverse chronological order ===
- Bishops of Sumbe (Roman rite), below
  - Bishop Firmino David (since 20 August 2023)
  - Bishop Luzizil Kiala (21 May 2013 – 29 September 2021), appointed Archbishop of Malanje
  - Bishop Benedito Roberto, C.S.Sp. (22 October 2006 – 19 May 2012), appointed Archbishop of Malanje; see below
- Bishops of Novo Redondo (Roman rite), below
  - Bishop Benedito Roberto, C.S.Sp. (15 December 1995 – 22 October 2006); see above
  - Bishop Zacarias Kamwenho (3 February 1977 – 3 March 1995.), appointed Coadjutor Archbishop of Luango; see below
- Bishop of Ngunza (Roman rite), below
  - Bishop Zacarias Kamwenho (10 August 1975 – 3 February 1977); see above

== See also ==
- Roman Catholicism in Angola

== Sources ==
- GCatholic.org
- "Diocese of Sumbe". Catholic-Hierarchy.org. David M. Cheney.
