= Diocese of Caxito =

Roman Catholic diocese in Angola

Coordinates: 8.5833°S 13.6586°E

Diocese of Caxito Dioecesis Caxitonsis

Location
- Country: Angola
- Metropolitan: Luanda

Statistics
- Population: Total; Catholics: (as of 2016); 1,234,000; 416,000 (33.7%%)
- Parishes: 12

Information
- Rite: Latin Rite
- Cathedral: Catedral Sant’Ana

Current leadership
- Pope: Leo XIV
- Bishop: Maurício Camuto, C.S.Sp.

The Roman Catholic Diocese of Caxito (Latin: Dioecesis Caxitonsis) is a diocese located in the city of Caxito in the ecclesiastical province of Luanda in Angola.

== History ==
- 6 June 2007: Established as Diocese of Caxito from the Metropolitan Archdiocese of Luanda

== Special churches ==
The Cathedral of the diocese is Catedral Sant’Ana in Caxito.

== Leadership ==
- António Francisco Jaca, S.V.D. (6 June 2007 - 26 March 2018), appointed Bishop of Benguela
- Maurício Camuto, C.S.Sp. (15 June 2020 – present)

== See also ==
- Roman Catholicism in Angola

== Sources ==
- GCatholic.org
- Catholic-hierarchy
