= Giovanni Calabria =

Italian Roman Catholic priest (1873–1954)

Saint Giovanni Calabria
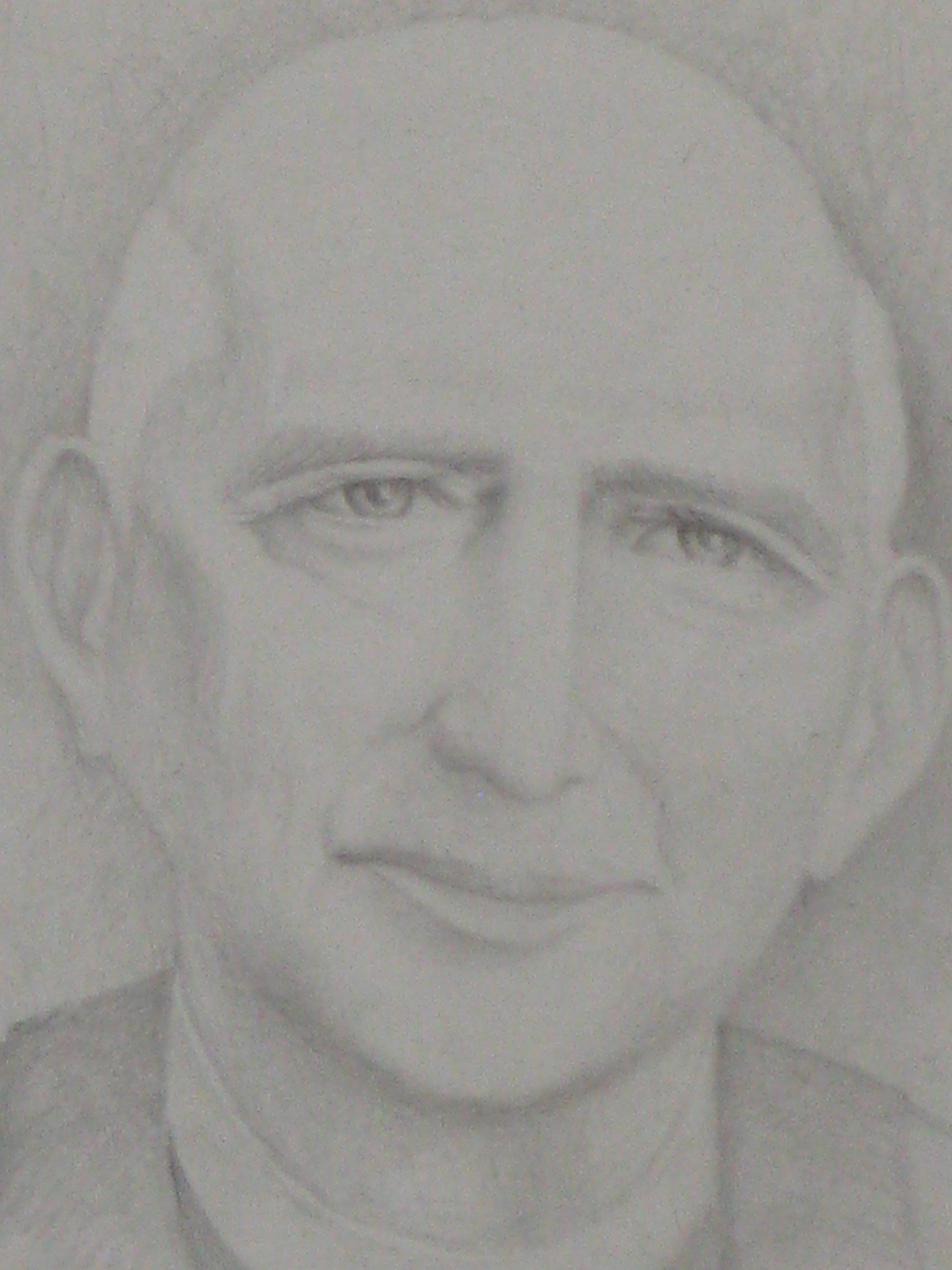
- St. Giovanni Calabria

Priest
- Born: 8 October 1873; Verona, Kingdom of Italy
- Died: 4 December 1954 (aged 81); Verona, Italy
- Venerated in: Roman Catholic Church
- Beatified: 17 April 1988, Saint Peter's Square, Vatican City by John Paul II
- Canonized: 18 April 1999, Saint Peter's Basilica, Vatican City by John Paul II
- Feast: 4 December
- Attributes: Priest's attire
- Patronage: Poor Servants of Divine Providence; Poor Sisters Servants of Divine Providence

Giovanni Calabria (8 October 1873 – 4 December 1954) was an Italian Roman Catholic priest who dedicated his life to the plight of the poor and the ill. He established two congregations, the Poor Servants of Divine Providence and the Poor Sisters Servants of Divine Providence to take better care of poor people in various Italian cities and later abroad while underpinning the need to promote the message of the gospel to the poor.

Pope John Paul II beatified him in 1988 and then canonized him a decade later in 1999. His liturgical feast is 4 December.

== Life ==
Giovanni Calabria was born in Verona, Italy on 8 October 1873 as the youngest of seven sons to Luigi Calabria and Angela Foschi. His mother was taught by Nicola Mazza.

His education was interrupted due to the death of his father in 1882 and it was around this time that the rector of San Lorenzo Pietro Scapini saw Calabria's potential and became his private tutor in order to prepare him for the examination that would determine if he could commence his studies for the priesthood. The death of his father saw him drop out of school to become an apprentice. He entered but was forced to drop out due to service with the armed forces where he converted fellow soldiers and was known for his faith and show of devotions.

One cold night in November 1897 he returned home from the hospital where he was visiting the ill to find a child on his doorstep who told him that he was fleeing those who would beat him. Calabria took him in and shared his room with him. In 1898 he founded the "Charitable Institution for the assistance to poor sick people" and started homes for abandoned teens. Calabria was ordained as a priest on 11 August 1901 and was then appointed as a confessor and also the curate of Saint Stephen's church. He became the rector of San Benedetto del Monte also in 1907.

On 26 November 1907 he founded the "Poor Servants of Divine Providence" in Case Rotte and it relocated in 1908 to Via San Zeno. It received diocesan approval on 11 February 1932 from the Bishop of Verona Girolamo Cardinale and then the decree of praise on 25 April 1949 before receiving full pontifical approval on 15 December 1956 from Pope Pius XII. Bartolomeo Bacilieri who suggested to him that he look into starting a female branch of the institute.

On 17 April 1910 he established the Poor Sisters Servants of Divine Providence. The first members of that congregation made their vows on 13 December 1911 and appointed Maria Galbraith (1874–1917) as the first superior of the order. It received diocesan approval on 25 March 1952 before receiving papal approval decades later on Christmas in 1981.

He had a great friend and admirer in anti-fascist Venerable Giulio Facibeni. On 8 September 1943 - during World War II - helped hide the Jewish doctor Mafalda Pavia near Verona among his female congregation; the doctor assumed the name of Sister Beatrice and spent eighteen months there while disguised as a sister. Calabria also corresponded in Latin with the noted author C.S. Lewis, both in Latin as he knew no English.

Calabria died on 4 December 1954 and on 3 December offered himself to God to die in the place of the ill Pius XII. The pope rallied and learned of Calabria's death and sent an official telegram of condolence.

== Sainthood ==
The beatification process commenced in both an informative and apostolic process in order to collect documentation and a range of witness interrogatories. Theologians collected his writings to assess if such writings were in line with the faith and approved them on 1 June 1968. The official start to the cause came on 6 March 1981 and Calabria was titled as a Servant of God. The two processes were later validated on 31 March 1984 in Rome and the Positio was sent a short time after in 1985 to the Congregation for the Causes of Saints.

Theologians approved the Positio on 8 October 1985 and the cardinal and bishop members of the C.C.S. did so as well on 10 December. Pope John Paul II named Calabria as Venerable on 16 January 1986 after confirming that the priest had indeed lived a life of heroic virtue. The miracle needed for him to be beatified was investigated and was validated on 31 March 1984 before receiving the approval of a medical board on 2 July 1986. Theologians approved it on 19 December 1986 while the C.C.S. did so as well on 17 February 1987 before receiving the approval of John Paul II on 16 March 1987 who beatified Calabria on 17 April 1988.

The second miracle that was needed for full sainthood was investigated and validated on 10 February 1995 in Rome and went on to receive the approval of the medical board on 4 July 1996 and then that of the theologians on 10 January 1997. The C.C.S. also approved it on 8 April 1997 while John Paul II issued the final approval needed for it on 7 July 1997 and then canonized Calabria on 18 April 1999.
