= Grezzana =

- Comune
- Comune di Grezzana
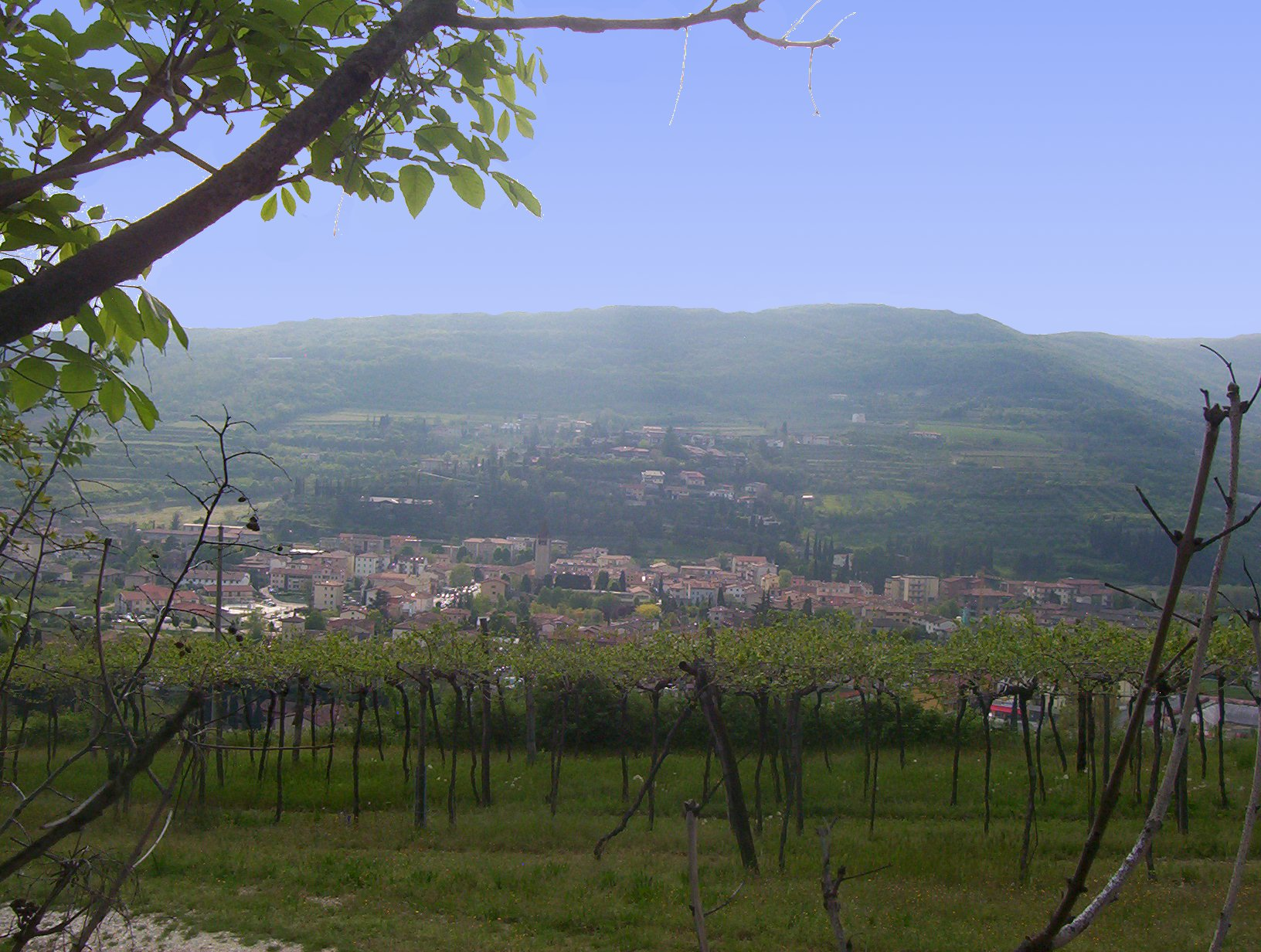

- Location within Italy Location within Veneto
- Coordinates: 45°31′N 11°1′E
- Country: Italy
- Region: Veneto
- Province: Verona (VR)
- Frazioni: Alcenago, Azzago, Corrubio, Corso, Lugo di Valpantena, Romagnano, Rosaro, Stallavena

Government
  - Mayor: Arturo Alberti

Area
  - Total: 52.0 km^{2} (20.1 sq mi)
- Elevation: 169 m (554 ft)

Population (30 November 2024)
  - Total: 10,763
  - Density: 207/km^{2} (536/sq mi)
- Demonym: Grezzanesi
- Time zone: UTC+1 (CET)
  - Summer (DST): UTC+2 (CEST)
- Postal code: 37023, 37020 frazioni
- Dialing code: 045
- Patron saint: Madonna della Cintura
- Website: Official website

Grezzana is a comune (municipality) in the Province of Verona in the Italian region Veneto, located about 100 kilometres (62 mi) west of Venice and about 10 kilometres (6 mi) northeast of Verona.

Grezzana borders the following municipalities: Bosco Chiesanuova, Cerro Veronese, Erbezzo, Negrar, Roverè Veronese, Sant'Anna d'Alfaedo, and Verona.
