= Damião António Franklin =

- Archbishop of Luanda
- Church: Catholic Church
- Archdiocese: Archdiocese of Luanda
- In office: 23 January 2001 – 28 April 2014
- Predecessor: Alexandre do Nascimento
- Successor: Filomeno do Nascimento Vieira Dias
- Previous posts: Titular Bishop of Falerone (1992-2001); Auxiliary Bishop of Luanda (1992-2001)

Orders
- Ordination: 28 June 1978
- Consecration: 12 July 1992 by Alexandre do Nascimento

Personal details
- Born: 6 August 1950 Cabinda, Protectorate of Portuguese Congo, Portuguese Angola, Portuguese Empire
- Died: 28 April 2014 (aged 63)

Damião António Franklin (6 August 1950 – 28 April 2014) was an Angolan prelate of the Roman Catholic Church. He was the fifth Archbishop of Luanda.

== Biography ==
Damião Franklin was born in Cabinda, Angola, and ordained to the priesthood in June 1978. On 29 May 1992, he was appointed Auxiliary Bishop of Luanda and Titular Bishop of Falerone. He received his episcopal consecration on the following 12 July from Alexandre Cardinal do Nascimento, with Archbishop Eduardo Muaca and Félix del Blanco Prieto serving as co-consecrators.

Franklin was later named Archbishop of Luanda on 23 January 2001. He also served as President of the Episcopal Conference of Angola-São Tomé. He has lamented the corruption in his country, saying, "Much of Angola's wealth goes on weapons. Some goes on extravagance like this new presidential palace which is hardly ever used. Huge sums simply vanish, into private hands."

In parallel, he was the Rector of the Catholic University of Angola.

Before the 2008 legislative election, the first election in Angola since the 1992 election that sparked the second phase of the Civil War, the Archbishop stated, "The best way to avoid war is to do the elections in an unquestionably free, just and transparent manner. It is important for political parties to continue collaborating with churches with the view to sensitize the society for a greater turnout in the electoral process."

He served as a secretary to Peter Cardinal Turkson at the special Synod of Bishops for Africa in October 2009.

Franklin died on 28 April 2014.
