= Mission sui iuris of Cunene =

The Mission sui iuris of Cunene was a short-lived missionary jurisdiction in present Angola, which was still a Portuguese colony.

== History ==
The mission sui iuris of Cunene was established in 1881, on territory split off from the then Apostolic Prefecture of Cimbebasia (the remainder of which was on 1 August 1892 renamed as Apostolic Prefecture of Upper Cimbebasia in Portuguese Angola, later Cubango in Angola, then suppressed in 1940).

It was exempt, i.e. not part of any ecclesiastical province. No ecclesiastical superiors seem to be recorded.

It was suppressed on 4 September 1940, and its territory merged into the newly erected Roman Catholic Diocese of Nova Lisboa, the nucleus of the present Metropolitan Archdiocese of Huambo.

== Source and external links ==
- GigaCatholic
