= Church of Our Lady of Remedies =

Coordinates: 8°48′49″S 13°13′47″E

- Igreja de Nossa Senhora dos Remédios
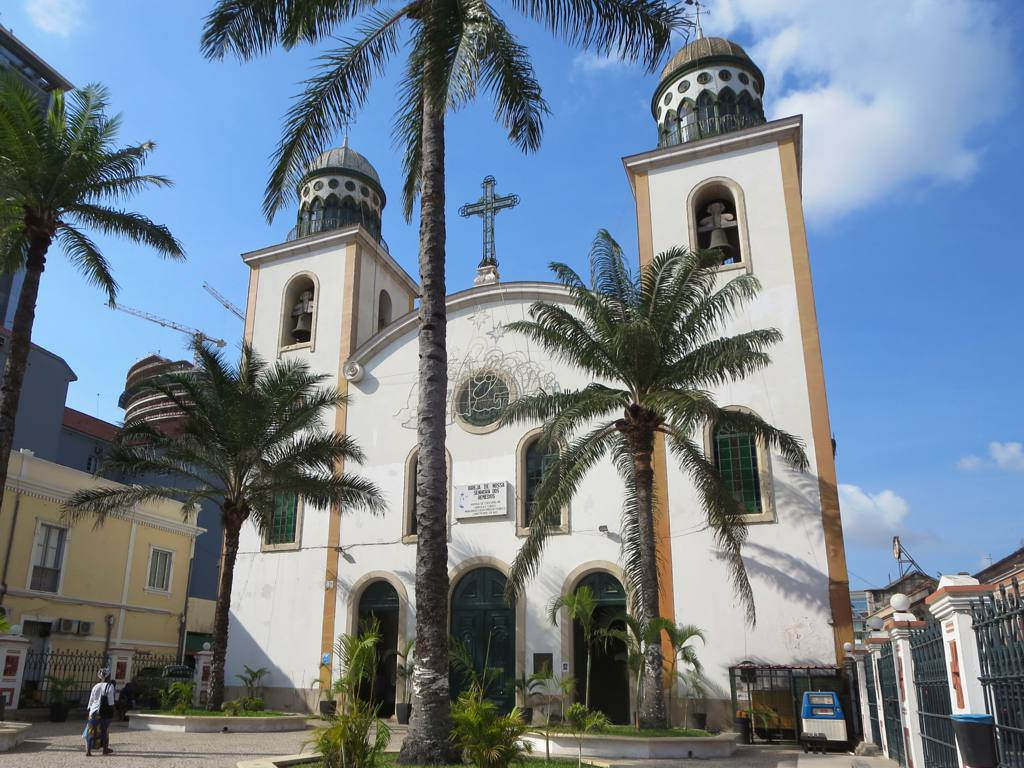
- Luanda Cathedral
- Church of Our Lady of Remedies
- Location: Luanda
- Country: Angola
- Denomination: Roman Catholic Church

History
- Consecrated: 1628

Administration
- Diocese: Luanda

The Church of Our Lady of Remedies (Portuguese: Igreja de Nossa Senhora dos Remédios) is a Roman Catholic cathedral in Luanda, Angola. It was built in 1628 and is the seat of the Roman Catholic Archbishop of Luanda. In 1716 the headquarters of the Diocese of Angola and Congo was transferred from São Salvador of Congo to Luanda, which eventually led the church of Dos Remedios to become cathedral. In 1877 it was in ruins and restored between 1880 and 1900. At that time acquired the present appearance, as three doors and a curved pediment on the façade.

In 1949 it was declared a Public Interest, when it was still part of the Portuguese colonial empire.
