= Manuel Franklin da Costa =

Angolan Roman Catholic Archdiocese of Huambo and Lubango

- Archbishop of Lubango
- Church: Catholic Church
- Archdiocese: Archdiocese of Lubango
- In office: 12 September 1986 – 15 January 1997
- Predecessor: Alexandre do Nascimento
- Successor: Zacarias Kamwenho
- Previous posts: Archbishop of Huambo (1977-1986); Bishop of Henrique de Carvalho (1975-1977)

Orders
- Ordination: 25 January 1948
- Consecration: 14 September 1975 by Giovanni De Andrea

Personal details
- Born: 31 August 1921 Cabinda, Portuguese Congo, Portuguese Empire
- Died: 17 July 2003 (aged 81)

Archbishop Manuel Franklin da Costa (31 August 1921 – 17 July 2003) was a Roman Catholic Archbishop of Huambo then Lubango, Angola.

Ordained priest in 1948, da Costa was appointed Bishop of Henrique de Carvalho (now the Diocese of Saurimo) in 1975, just months before Angola achieved recognized independence. In February 1977, da Costa became the Archbishop of Huambo and in 1986, Archbishop of Lubango, where he would stay until his retirement in 1997.

== Sources ==
- Manuel Franklin da Costa catholic-hierarchy.org
