= Oscar Lino Lopes Fernandes Braga =

Bishop of Benguela, Angola (1931–2020)

Oscar Lino Lopes Fernandes Braga (30 September 1931 – 26 May 2020) was the Roman Catholic bishop of the Roman Catholic Diocese of Benguela, Angola. A priest since 26 July 1964, Braga was the Bishop of the Diocese of Benguela since 2 February 1975 until his retirement on 18 February 2008.
