= Diocese of Ndalatando =

Roman Catholic diocese in Angola

Coordinates: 9.3082°S 14.9123°E

Diocese of Ndalatando Dioecesis Ndalatandensis
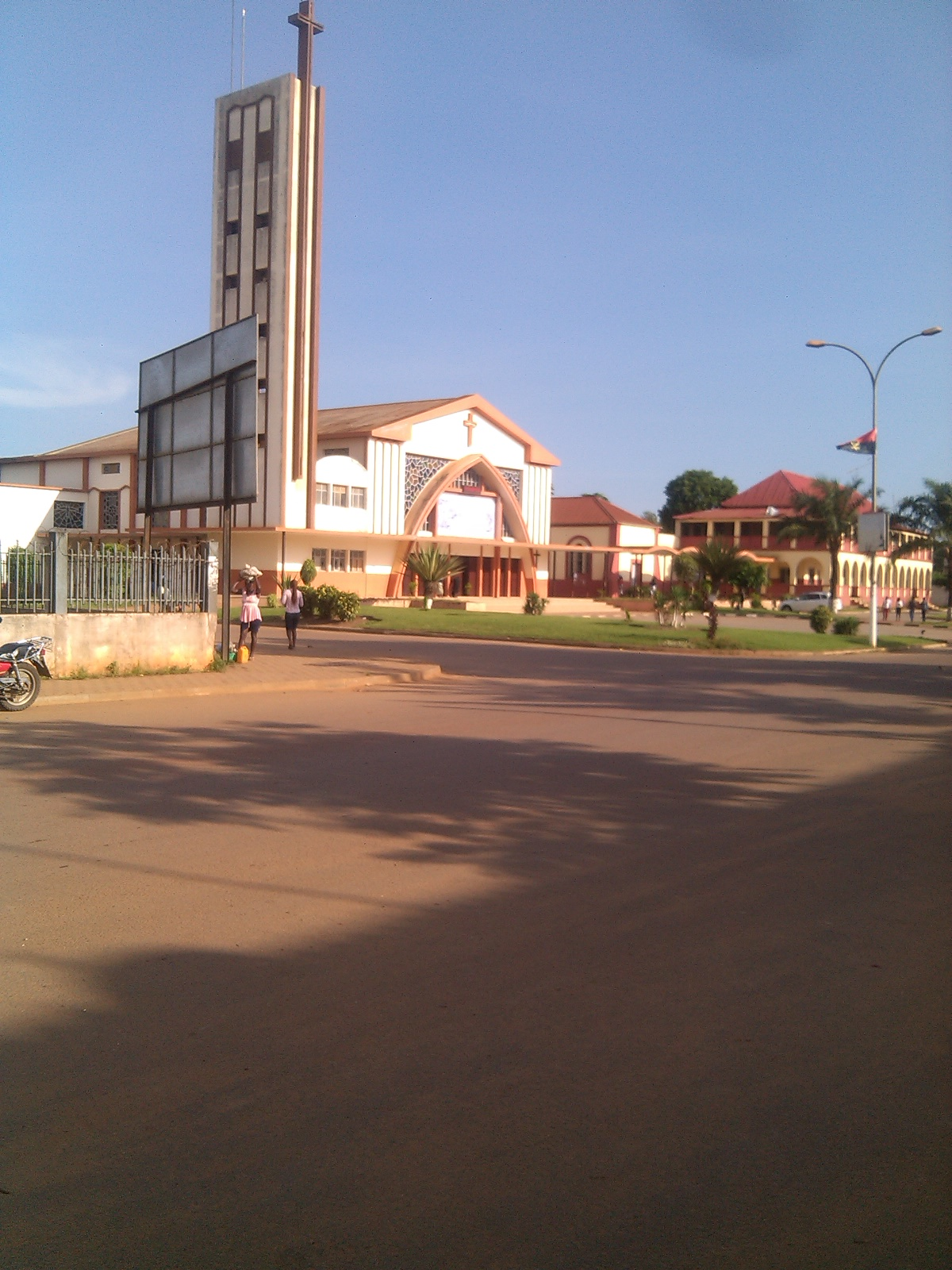
- Cathedral of São João Baptista

Location
- Country: Angola

Statistics
- Area: 19,357 km^{2} (7,474 sq mi)
- Population: Total; Catholics: 516,500; 249,550 (48.3%)
- Parishes: 13

Information
- Denomination: Catholicism
- Sui iuris church: Latin Church
- Rite: Roman
- Established: March 26, 1990
- Archdiocese: Malanje
- Cathedral: Sé Catedral de São João Baptista
- Secular priests: 18

Current leadership
- Bishop: Almeida Kanda

The Roman Catholic Diocese of Ndalatando (Latin: Dioecesis Ndalatandensis) is a diocese located in the city of Ndalatando in the ecclesiastical province of Malanje in Angola.

== History ==
- 3 March 1990: Established as Diocese of Ndalatando from the Metropolitan Archdiocese of Luanda

== Special churches ==
The Cathedral of the diocese is Sé Catedral de São João Baptista in N'Dalatando.

== Leadership ==
- Bishops of Ndalatando (Roman rite), in reverse chronological order
  - Bishop Almeida Kanda (since 23 July 2005)
  - Bishop Pedro Luís Guido Scarpa, O.F.M. Cap. (26 March 1990 – 23 July 2005)

== See also ==
- Roman Catholicism in Angola

== Sources ==
- GCatholic.org
- "Diocese of Ndalatando". Catholic-Hierarchy.org. David M. Cheney.
