= Archdiocese of Lubango =

Roman Catholic archdiocese in Angola

Coordinates: 14.9163°S 13.4981°E

Archdiocese of Lubango Archidiœcesis Lubangensis Arquidiocese do Lubango

Location
- Country: Angola

Statistics
- Area: 118,000 km^{2} (46,000 sq mi)

Information
- Denomination: Catholic
- Rite: Roman Rite
- Established: 1955
- Cathedral: Cathedral of St. Joseph, Lubango

Current leadership
- Pope: Leo XIV
- Archbishop: Gabriel Mbilingi
- Bishops emeritus: Zacarias Kamwenho

The Archdiocese of Lubango (Latin: Archidioecesis Lubangensis) is the Metropolitan See for the ecclesiastical province of Lubango in Angola. The cathedral of the archdiocese is the Cathedral of St. Joseph, Lubango.

== History ==
- 27 July 1955: Established as Diocese of Sá da Bandeira from Diocese of Nova Lisboa
- 3 February 1977: Promoted as Metropolitan Archdiocese of Lubango

== Bishops ==
=== Ordinaries, in reverse chronological order ===
- Metropolitan Archbishops of Lubango (Roman rite), below
  - Archbishop Gabriel Mbilingi: 5 September 2009 – present
  - Archbishop Zacarias Kamwenho, C.SS.R.: 15 January 1997 – 5 September 2009
  - Archbishop Manuel Franklin da Costa: 12 September 1986 – 15 January 1997
  - Archbishop, later Cardinal, Alexandre do Nascimento: 3 February 1977 – 16 February 1986, Cardinal in 1983; appointed Archbishop of Luanda
  - Archbishop Eurico Dias Nogueira: 19 February 1972 – 3 November 1977
- Bishop of Sá da Bandeira (Roman rite), below
  - Bishop Altino Ribeiro de Santana: 27 July 1955 – 19 February 1972, appointed Bishop of Beira, Mozambique

=== Coadjutor archbishops ===
- Zacarias Kamwenho (1995–1997)
- Gabriel Mbilingi, C.S.Sp. (2006–2009)

== Suffragan dioceses ==
- Diocese of Menongue
- Diocese of Namibe
- Diocese of Ondjiva

== Sources ==
- GCatholic.org
