= Diocese of Uíje =

Roman Catholic diocese in Angola

Coordinates: 7.6122°S 15.0520°E

Diocese of Uíje Dioecesis Uiiensis

Location
- Country: Angola

Statistics
- Area: 64,022 km^{2} (24,719 sq mi)
- Population: Total; Catholics: 2,096,000; 1,346,201 (64.2%)
- Parishes: 24

Information
- Denomination: Catholicism
- Sui iuris church: Latin Church
- Rite: Roman
- Established: March 14, 1967
- Archdiocese: Archdiocese of Malanje
- Secular priests: 41

Current leadership
- Bishop: Joaquim Nhanganga Tyombe
- Vicar General: João Lala

Map
- Uíge Province, location of the Diocese, within Angola

The Roman Catholic Diocese of Uíje (Latin: Dioecesis Uiiensis) is a diocese located in the ecclesiastical province of Malanje in Angola.

== History ==
- March 14, 1967: Established as Diocese of Carmona and São Salvador from the Metropolitan Archdiocese of Luanda
- May 16, 1979: Renamed as Diocese of Uíje

== Special churches ==
The Cathedral of the diocese is Sé Catedral de Nossa Senhora da Conceição (Cathedral Church of the Conception of Our Lady) in Uije .

== Bishops ==
=== Ordinaries, in reverse chronological order ===
- Bishops of Uíje (Roman rite), below
  - Bishop Joaquim Nhanganga Tyombe (since 2 February 2021)
  - Bishop Emílio Sumbelelo (February 2, 2008 – February 11, 2019), appointed Bishop of Viana
  - Bishop José Francisco Moreira dos Santos, OFMCap (May 16, 1979 – February 2, 2008), retired; see below
- Bishop of Carmona and São Salvador (Roman rite), below
  - Bishop José Francisco Moreira dos Santos, OFMCap (March 14, 1967 – May 16, 1979); see above

=== Coadjutor bishop ===
- Emílio Sumbelelo (2006-2008)

=== Other priests of this diocese who became bishops ===
- Almeida Kanda (Canda), appointed Bishop of Ndalatando in 2005
- Luzizila Kiala, appointed Bishop of Sumbe in 2013

== See also ==
- Roman Catholicism in Angola
