= Sumbe =

Sumbe Novo Redondo
- Municipality
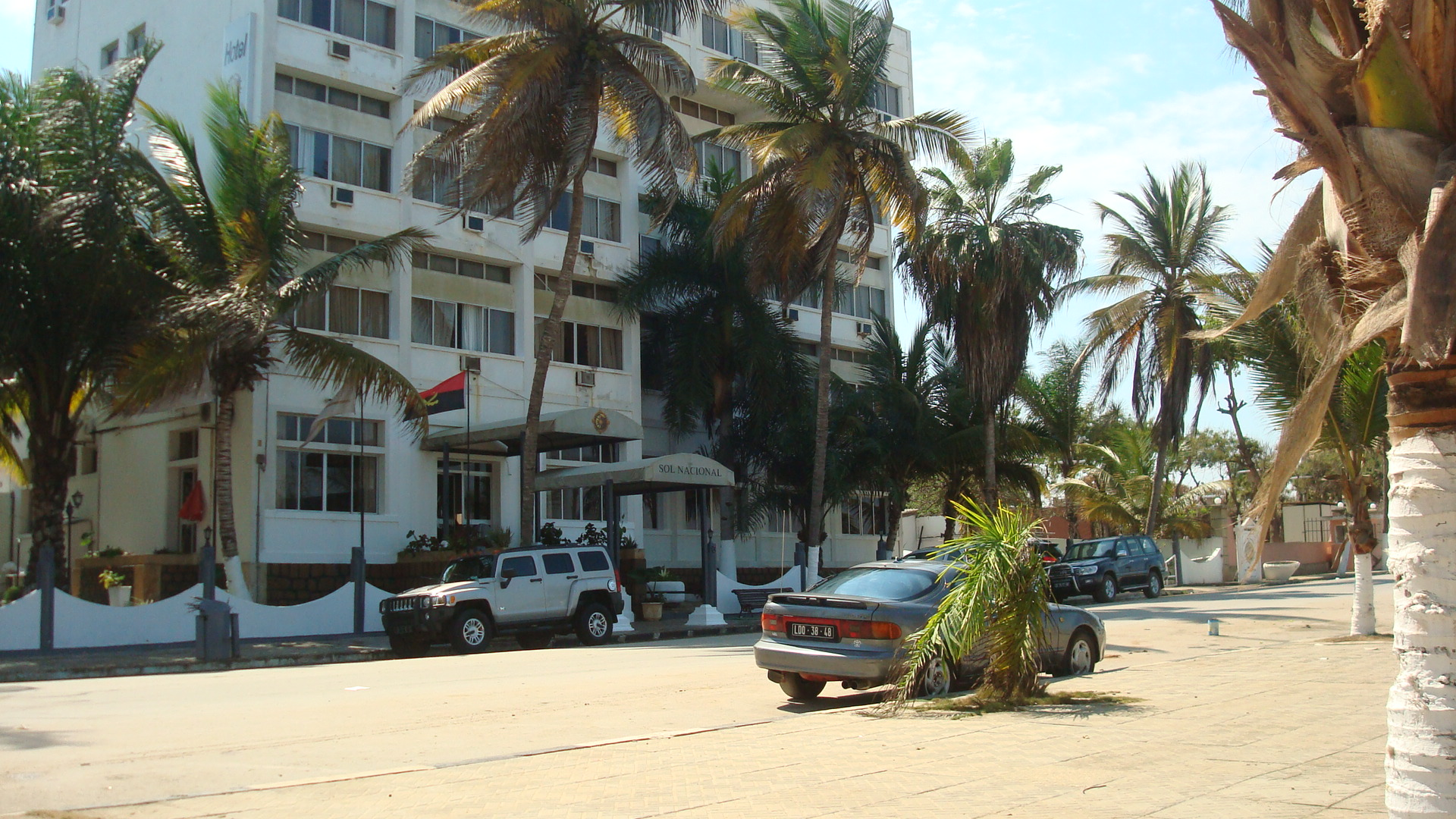
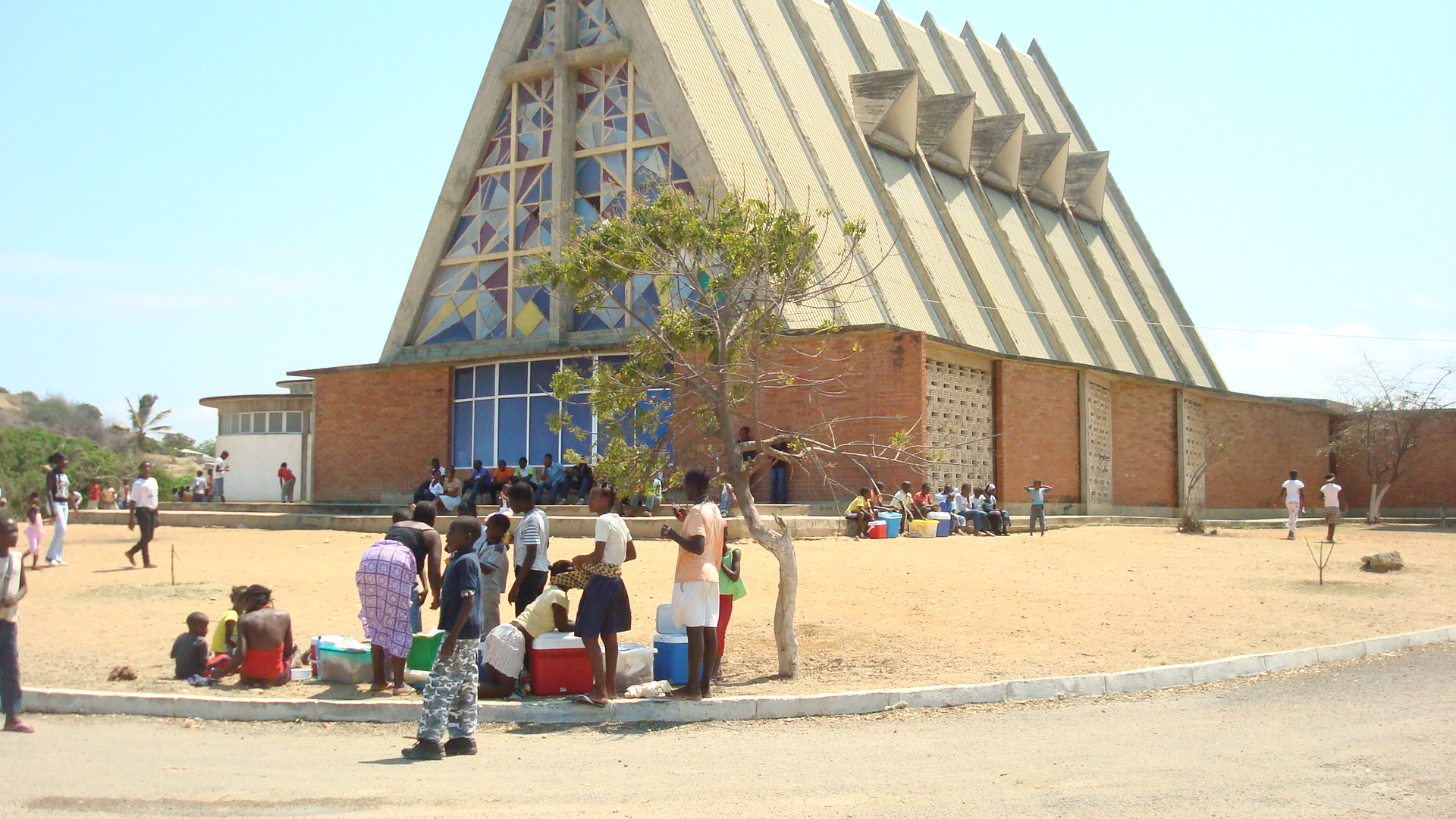
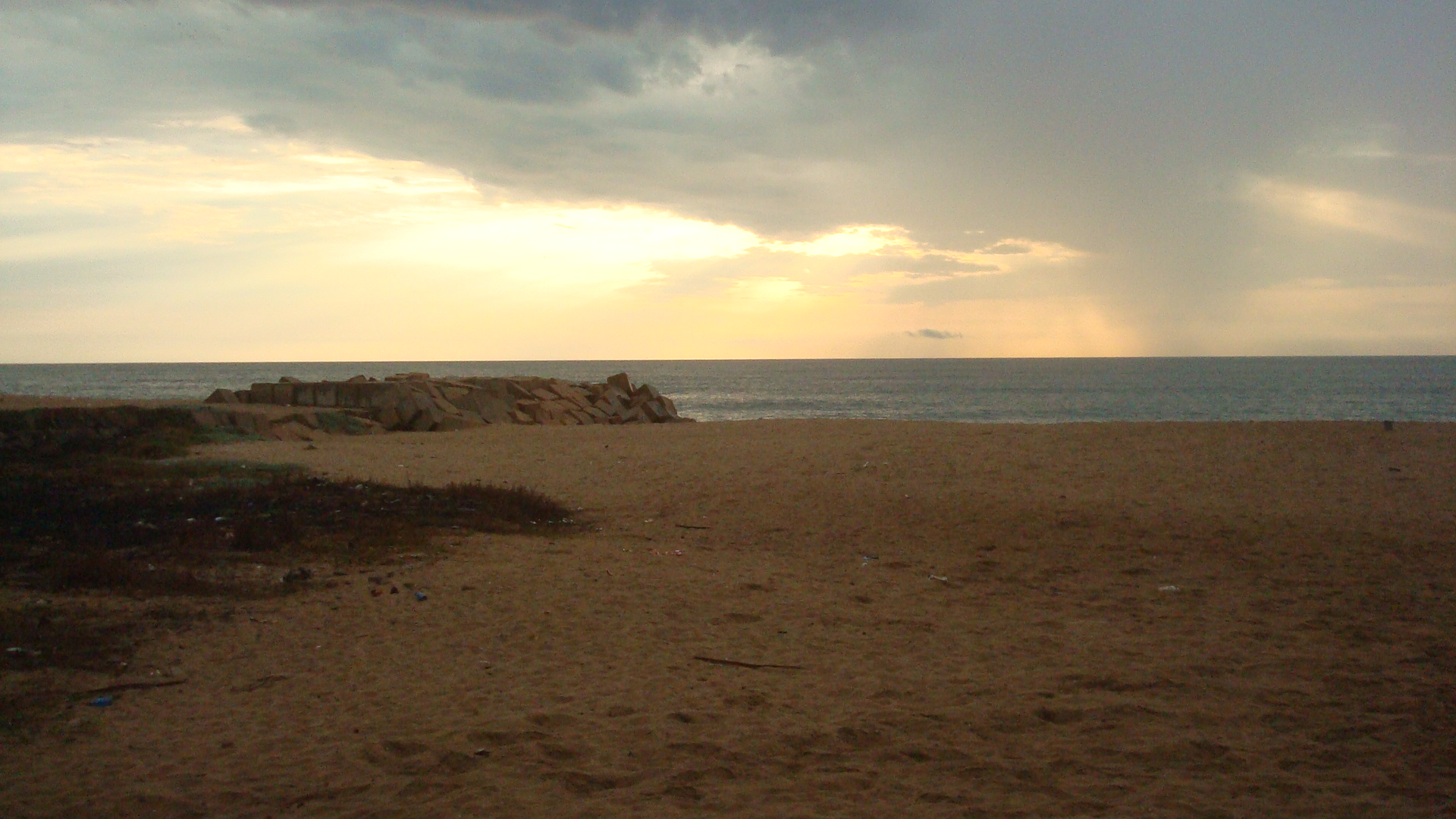

- Location within Angola
- Coordinates: 11°12′19″S 13°50′30″E
- Country: Angola
- Province: Cuanza Sul

Area
  - Land: 4,638 km^{2} (1,791 sq mi)
- Elevation: 0 m (0 ft)

Population (2014)
  - Municipality: 279,968
  - Density: 5.5/km^{2} (14/sq mi)
  - Urban: 205,832
- Climate: BSh
- Novo Redondo Lighthouse
- Constructed: 1889 (first)
- Construction: masonry tower (current)
- Height: 15 metres (49 ft) (current); 7 metres (23 ft) (first)
- Shape: cylindrical truncated tower with lantern (current) cylindrical post atop a 1-storey house (first)
- Markings: white and red horizontal band (current) black post (first)
- Power source: solar power
- Operator: Instituto Marítimo e Portuário de Angola
- First lit: 1970s (current)
- Deactivated: 1970s (first)
- Focal height: 34 metres (112 ft)
- Range: 8 nmi (15 km; 9.2 mi)
- Characteristic: Fl W 3s

Sumbe, formerly Novo Redondo, is a city located in west central Angola. It is the administrative capital of Cuanza Sul Province. In 2014 its population was 279,968.

== Geography ==
Sumbe municipality stretches, North until the Queve river, West until the Balombo river, West limited by the Atlantic Ocean and East to the Conda Municipality.

=== Climate ===
The city has a dry tropical climate. The hottest temperatures are from January to April, and the coldest months are July and August.

== Transportation ==
Air transportation is served by Angola Air Services, SAL, and Inter Transit.

== See also ==
- List of lighthouses in Angola
