= Archdiocese of Malanje =

Roman Catholic archdiocese in Angola

Coordinates: 9.5460°S 16.3522°E

Archdiocese of Malanje Archidioecesis Malaniensis

Location
- Country: Angola

Statistics
- Area: 97,602 km^{2} (37,684 sq mi)
- Population: Total; Catholics: 1,095,540; 658190 (60.1%)
- Parishes: 23

Information
- Denomination: Catholicism
- Rite: Roman
- Established: November 15, 1957
- Cathedral: Cathedral of Our Lady of the Assumption
- Secular priests: 13
- Metropolitan Archbishop: Luzizila Kiala
- Suffragans: Ndalatando, Uíje
- Vicar General: António Adão António

Map
- Location of Malanje within Angola

The Roman Catholic Archdiocese of Malanje (Latin: Archidioecesis Malaniensis) is an archdiocese located in Malanje, Angola. Until its elevation to an archdiocese in 2011, it belonged to the ecclesiastical province of Luanda, like the two dioceses over which it has now oversight: the Diocese of Uíje and the Diocese of Ndalatando.

== History ==
- 25 November 1957: Established as Diocese of Malanje from the Metropolitan Archdiocese of Luanda and Diocese of Silva Porto
- 12 April 2011: Elevated to Archdiocese

== Statistics ==
The Archdiocese has an area of 107,000 km², a total population of 1,090,000, a Catholic population of 500,000, 49 priests, and 140 religious.

== Special churches ==
The Cathedral of the diocese is Sé Catedral de Nossa Senhora da Assunção (Cathedral Church of the Assumption of Our Lady) in Malanje.

== Bishops ==
=== Ordinaries, in reverse chronological order ===
- Archbishops of Malanje (Roman rite), below
  - Archbishop Luzizila Kiala (29 September 2021 – ...)
  - Archbishop Benedito Roberto, C.S.Sp. (19 May 2012 – 8 November 2020)
  - Archbishop Luis María Pérez de Onraíta (12 April 2011 – 19 May 2012); see below
- Bishops of Malanje (Roman rite), below
  - Bishop Luis María Pérez de Onraita Aguirre (27 August 1998 – 04.12=2011); see above
  - Bishop Eugénio Salessu (3 February 1977 – 27 August 1998)
  - Bishop Alexandre do Nascimento (10 August 1975 – 3 February 1977), appointed Archbishop of Lubango; future Cardinal
  - Bishop Eduardo André Muaca (25 September 1973 – 10 August 1975), appointed Coadjutor Archbishop of Luanda
  - Bishop Pompeu de Sá Leão y Seabra, C.S.Sp. (20 December 1962 – 7 April 1973)
  - Bishop Manuel Nunes Gabriel (5 December 1957 – 13 February 1962), appointed Coadjutor Archbishop of Luanda

=== Coadjutor bishop ===
- Luis María Pérez de Onraita Aguirre (1995-1998)

== Suffragan dioceses ==
- Diocese of Ndalatando
- Diocese of Uíje

== See also ==
- Roman Catholicism in Angola

== Sources ==
- GCatholic.org
- "Archdiocese of Malanje". Catholic-Hierarchy.org. David M. Cheney.
