= Catholic Church in Angola =

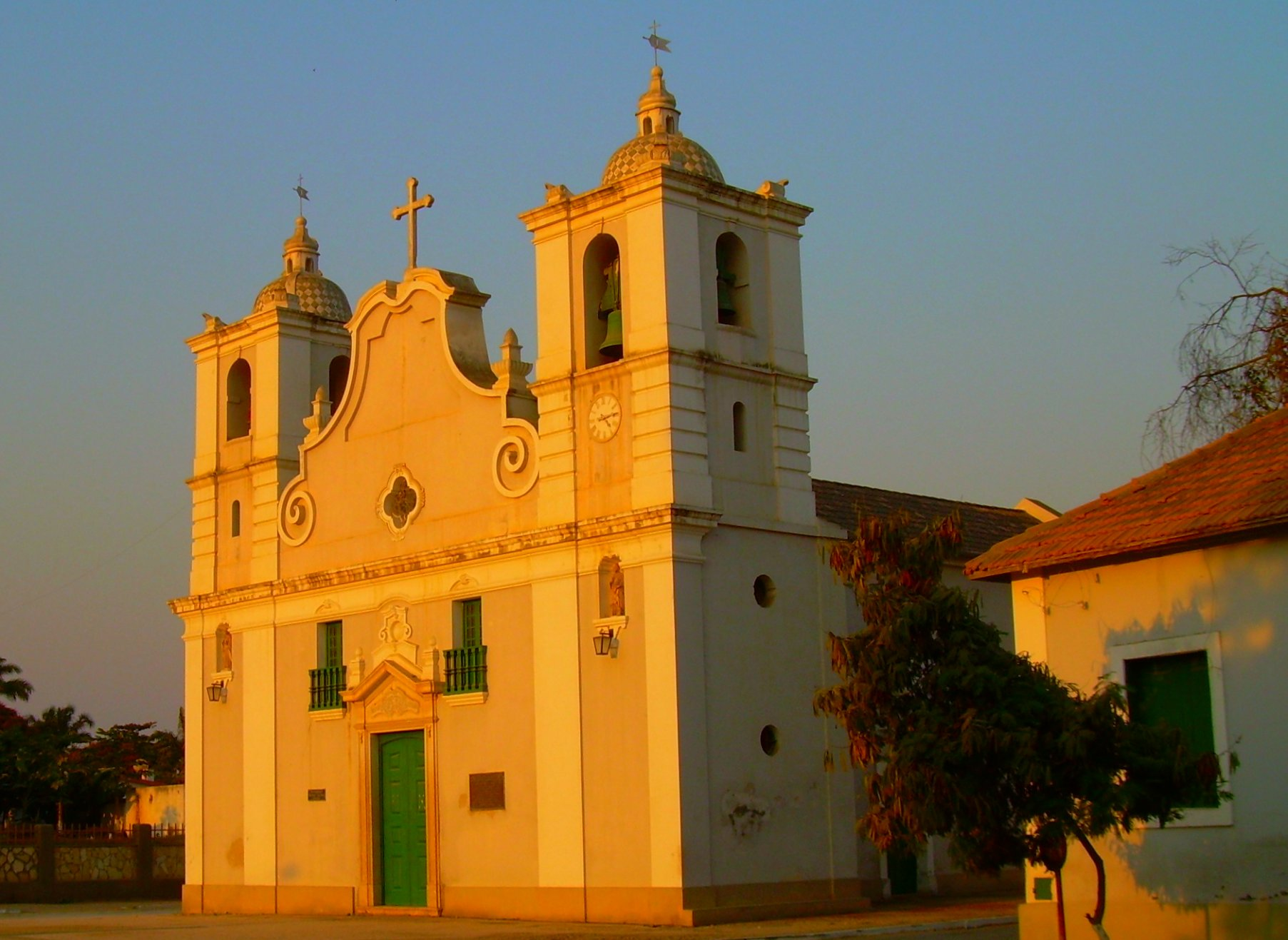
Catholic Church in Benguela

The Catholic Church in Angola is part of the worldwide Catholic Church, under the spiritual leadership of the Pope in Rome.

Catholicism was introduced to Angola by the Portuguese explorers since 1491 when the first missionaries arrived.

Many of the missionaries saw themselves as Portuguese, rather than integrating into Angolan society. Non-Portuguese missionaries were required to renounce the laws of their own country and submit to Portuguese law, as well as prove their ability to speak and write the Portuguese language. The Colonial Act of 1930 advanced the view that Portuguese Catholic missions to the country were "instruments of civilization and national influence".

== Demographics ==
The last census in 2014 noted that 56.4% of the Angolan population identified as Roman Catholic.

As of 2020, approximately 53.85% of the population professed the Catholic faith, due largely to Angola's history as a former Portuguese colony.

== Internal structure ==
The Catholic Church has 19 dioceses in Angola, including 5 archdioceses. All the bishops are members of the regional Episcopal Conference of Angola and São Tomé.

- Archdiocese of Huambo
  - Diocese of Benguela
  - Diocese of Ganda
  - Diocese of Kwito-Bié
- Archdiocese of Luanda
  - Diocese of Cabinda
  - Diocese of Caxito
  - Diocese of Mbanza Congo
  - Diocese of Sumbe
  - Diocese of Viana
- Archdiocese of Lubango
  - Diocese of Menongue
  - Diocese of Ondjiva
  - Diocese of Namibe
- Archdiocese of Malanje
  - Diocese of Ndalatando
  - Diocese of Uíje
- Archdiocese of Saurímo
  - Diocese of Dundo
  - Diocese of Lwena

== Influence ==
The Catholic University of Angola opened in 1998.

In 2020, the Vatican noted that there are over 1200 priests and 2200 nuns in Angola, serving 469 parishes and 44 Catholic hospitals.

The Catholic radio station Ecclesia is broadcast in 16 of Angola's 18 provinces. Vatican Radio and Maria Radio also operate in the country.

== See also ==
- Catholic Church by country
- Religion in Angola
- Christianity in Angola
- Protestantism in Angola
