= Martin Lasarte Topolanski =

Uruguayan Catholic prelate (born 1962)

The Most Reverend Martín Lasarte Topolanski
- Bishop of Lwena, Angola
- Church: Catholic Church
- Archdiocese: Roman Catholic Archdiocese of Saurimo
- See: Roman Catholic Diocese of Lwena
- Appointed: 1 July 2023
- Installed: 3 September 2023
- Predecessor: Jesús Tirso Blanco
- Successor: Incumbent

Orders
- Ordination: 17 August 1991 in Montevideo, Uruguay
- Consecration: 3 March 2013 by José Manuel Imbamba
- Rank: Bishop

Personal details
- Born: Martín Lasarte Topolanski; 12 October 1962 (age 63) Montevideo, Archdiocese of Montevideo, Uruguay

Styles of Martin Lasarte Topolanski
- Reference style: Your Lordship; The Most Reverend
- Spoken style: His Lordship
- Religious style: Bishop

Martín Lasarte Topolanski S.D.B. (also Martín Lasarte Topolansky) born 12 October 1962, is a Uruguayan Catholic prelate who works as the bishop of the Roman Catholic Diocese of Lwena in Angola, since 1 July 2023. Before that, from 17 August 1991 until he was appointed bishop, he was a priest of the Catholic religious Order of the Salesians of Saint John Bosco. He was appointed bishop by Pope Francis. He was consecrated bishop and installed at Luena, Angola on 3 September 2023.

== Background and education ==
He was born on 25 October 1962, in Montevideo, Uruguay. He became a member of the Salesians of Saint John Bosco religious order while in seminary in that city on 1 February 1981. He made his first religious vows on 31 January 1982, and perpetual vows on 31 January 1986. He successfully undertook advanced religious studies in sacred scripture at the Pontifical Biblical Institute in Rome, Italy from 1991 until 1995.

== Priesthood ==
He was ordained a Salesian Priest on 17 August 1991, in Montevideo, Uruguay, South America. He had relocated to Angola as a missionary, in 1990. He had spent the time from 1985 to 1986 as a member of the Talleres Don Bosco religious community in the Uruguayan capital. He served as a priest until 1 July 2023.

While a priest, he served in various roles and locations, including:

- Studies in sacred scripture at the Pontifical Biblical Institute in Rome from 1991 until 1995.
- Formator in the Salesian Seminary in Luanda from 1995 until 2001.
- Professor in the Major Seminary of Luanda from 1995 until 2001.
- Parish priest of São Pedro e São Paulo in Lwena Diocese from 2001 until 2008.
- Advisor to the Mamã Muxima Visitation of Angola from 2001 until 2008.
- Delegate for Salesian youth pastoral care in Angola from 2009 until 2015.
- Professor at the Major Seminary of Luanda from 2009 until 2015.
- Professor at the Catholic University of Angola from 2009 until 2015.
- Professor at the Instituto Superior Dom Bosco, in Luanda from 2009 until 2015.
- Director of the department of the Universidade Católica de Angola from 2009 until 2015.
- Vicar of the Mamã Muxima Visitation of Angola from 2013 until 2015.
- Collaborator in the Department for Missions of the General Curia of the Salesians of Don Bosco from 2015 until 2020.
- Superior of the Mamã Muxima Visitation of Angola from 2020 until 2023.

== Bishop ==
On 1 July 2023, Pope Francis named him Bishop of the Diocese of Lwena, in the Roman Catholic Archdiocese of Saurimo, in Angola. He was consecrated bishop and installed at Luena, Angola, on 3 September 2023 by José Manuel Imbamba, Archbishop of Saurimo assisted by Estanislau Marques Chindekasse, Bishop of Dundo and Gaston Kashala Ruwezi, Bishop of Sakania-Kipushi in neighboring Democratic Republic of the Congo. As of 2025, he is the local ordinary of the diocese of Lwena, in Angola.

== See also ==
- Catholic Church in Angola

== Succession table ==
Catholic Church titles
Preceded by Jesús Tirso Blanco (26 November 2007 - 22 February 2022)	Bishop of Lwena (since 1 July 2023)	Succeeded by Incumbent
