= Vicente Sanombo =

Angolan Catholic prelate (born in 1964)

The Most Reverend Vicente Sanombo
- Bishop of Kwito-Bié, Angola
- Church: Catholic Church
- Archdiocese: Roman Catholic Archdiocese of Huambo
- See: Roman Catholic Diocese of Kwito-Bié
- Appointed: 28 March 2024
- Installed: 14 July 2024
- Predecessor: José Nambi
- Successor: Incumbent

Orders
- Ordination: 6 November 1992
- Consecration: 23 June 2024 by Zeferino Zeca Martins
- Rank: Bishop

Personal details
- Born: Vicente Sanombo; 23 October 1964 (age 60); Cangenge, Lunda Norte Province, Angola

Styles of Vicente Sanombo
- Reference style: Your Lordship; The Most Reverend
- Spoken style: His Lordship
- Religious style: Bishop

Vicente Sanombo (born 23 October 1964) is an Angolan Catholic prelate who is the bishop of the Roman Catholic Diocese of Kwito-Bié in Angola, since 28 March 2024. Before that from 6 November 1992, he was a priest of the Roman Catholic Archdiocese of Huambo, Angola. He was appointed bishop by Pope Francis. He was consecrated bishop on 23 June 2024 at Huambo. He was installed at Cuíto on 14 July 2024.

== Background and education ==
He was born on 23 October 1964 in Cangenge, Angola. He studied philosophy and theology at the Christ the King Major Seminary in Huambo. He holds a Licentiate in Sacred Scripture, awarded by the Pontifical Biblical Institute (now a component of the Pontifical Gregorian University) in Rome.

== Priest ==
He was ordained a priest for the Catholic Archdiocese of Huambo on 6 November 1992. He served in that capacity until 28 March 2024. While a priest, he served in various roles and locations including:

- Bursar of the Minor Seminary at Huambo.
- Rector of the Minor Seminary at Huambo.
- Rector of the Philosophical Major Seminary at Huambo.
- Head of the Good Shepherd Pastoral Centre.
- Lecturer in Sacred Scripture at the Christ the King Major Seminary at Huambo from 2004 until 2024.
- Parish priest of the Diocesan Cathedral at Huambo from 2009 until 2024.
- Vicar General of the Roman Catholic Archdiocese of Huambo from 2010 until 2024.
- Assessor of the Episcopal Conference of Angola and São Tomé from 2019 until 2024.

== Bishop ==
On 28 March 2024, Pope Francis appointed him bishop of the diocese of Kwito-Bié, Angola. He was consecrated bishop at Huambo on 23 June 2024 by Zeferino Zeca Martins, Archbishop of Huambo assisted by José de Queirós Alves, Archbishop Emeritus of Huambo and Estanislau Marques Chindekasse, Bishop of Dundo. He was installed at Cuito, Angola on 14 Jul 2024.

== See also ==
- Catholic Church in Angola

== Succession table ==
Catholic Church titles
Preceded by José Nambi (15 January 1997 - 31 October 2022)	Bishop of Kwito-Bié (since 28 March 2024)	Succeeded by Incumbent
