= 2026 IHF Women's U20 Handball World Championship squads =

This article displays the squads for the 2026 IHF Women's U20 Handball World Championship. Each team consisted of 18 players, of which 16 were fielded for each game.

Age, club, appearances and goals correct as of 24 June 2026.

== Group A ==
=== Egypt ===
The final squad was announced on 18 June 2026.

Head coach: (Egypt) Helmy Mosabah

No.	Pos.	Name	Date of birth (age)	Height	App.	Goals	Club
1	GK	Jaydaa Salama	18 February 2009 (aged 17)	1.83 m	6	0	(Egypt) Aviation Sporting Club
2	CB	Razan Khaled	25 October 2006 (aged 19)	1.60 m	0	0	(Egypt) Zamalek
4	LW	Jana Yasser	18 May 2006 (aged 20)	1.70 m	19	23	(Egypt) Zamalek
5	P	Basmala Ahmed	10 January 2006 (aged 20)	1.80 m	19	18	(Egypt) Al-Ahly
9	CB	Shrouk El-Sheref	7 July 2006 (aged 19)	1.74 m	52	106	(Egypt) Al-Ahly
10	CB	Merna Ashraf	23 March 2008 (aged 18)	1.65 m	5	2	(Egypt) Faqous
16	GK	Retaj Mohamed	25 March 2009 (aged 17)	1.76 m	0	0	(Egypt) Al-Zohour
21	LB	Sondos Essam	1 January 2008 (aged 18)	1.68 m	10	19	(Egypt) Giza Sports Club
23	LB	Jana Mahmoud	31 January 2007 (aged 19)	1.76 m	5	5	(Egypt) El Shams
30	RB	Reem Ahmed	31 January 2008 (aged 18)	1.74 m	6	17	(Egypt) Al-Ahly
39	LW	Jowaireya Tamer	31 January 2009 (aged 17)	1.65 m	6	18	(Egypt) Faqous
55	RW	Malak Khames	7 August 2009 (aged 16)	1.72 m	0	0	(Egypt) Horse Owners'
68	P	Nada Tamer	17 October 2006 (aged 19)	1.80 m	14	16	(Egypt) 6th of October
70	RW	Rokaya Mohamed	18 May 2006 (aged 20)	1.71 m	20	48	(Egypt) Smouha
80	P	Amal Said	14 November 2007 (aged 18)	1.84 m	0	0	(Egypt) Smouha
88	RW	Sarmada Deabes	7 July 2007 (aged 18)	1.66 m	13	19	(Egypt) Zamalek
98	GK	Gihad Sayed	21 February 2006 (aged 20)	1.78 m	48	1	(Egypt) Al-Ahly
99	CB	Judy Waled	28 July 2007 (aged 18)	1.67 m	22	56	(Egypt) Zamalek

=== France ===
The final squad was announced on 15 June 2026.

Head coach: (France) Eric Baradat

No.	Pos.	Name	Date of birth (age)	Height	App.	Goals	Club
1	GK	Léane Gonzalez	6 July 2007 (aged 18)	1.75 m	12	0	(France) Strasbourg ATH
4	RW	Blandine Gros	31 March 2006 (aged 20)	1.69 m	6	8	(France) Metz Handball
5	LW	Jade Barbarin	24 June 2007 (aged 19)	1.68 m	3	4	(France) ESBF Besançon
6	RW	Louane Henry	15 March 2007 (aged 19)	1.65 m	6	3	(France) JDA Dijon
7	RW	Dawiya Abdou	3 May 2006 (aged 20)	1.68 m	30	52	(France) Chambray
8	LW	Liyah Naal	27 March 2007 (aged 19)	1.68 m	10	21	(France) Plan-de-Cuques
9	RB	Zeina Injai	10 September 2007 (aged 18)	1.78 m	12	24	(France) Stella Saint-Maur
10	CB	Claire Koestner	10 February 2006 (aged 20)	1.68 m	10	27	(France) Saint-Amand-les-Eaux
11	LB	Emma Bureu-Cruz	17 May 2007 (aged 19)	1.75 m	12	26	(France) Mérignac
13	P	Eléa Ferdilus	1 June 2007 (aged 19)	1.78 m	15	36	(France) Metz Handball
14	LB	Yvana Atangana	17 September 2006 (aged 19)	1.78 m	3	8	(France) Metz Handball
15	P	Lyson Samai	3 August 2007 (aged 18)	1.72 m	10	26	(France) Strasbourg ATH
16	GK	Romane Gindro	28 February 2007 (aged 19)	1.84 m	9	0	(France) ESBF Besançon
17	LB	Mélissa Chantelly	21 March 2006 (aged 20)	1.74 m	15	36	(France) Strasbourg ATH
18	LW	Mara Vama	24 March 2007 (aged 19)	1.71 m	9	11	(France) Fleury-les-Aubrais
19	P	Lalie Lambet	25 March 2006 (aged 20)	1.73 m	3	7	(France) ESBF Besançon
21	CB	Prunelle Kingue	19 March 2006 (aged 20)	1.79 m	12	28	(France) ESBF Besançon
24	GK	Maëlle Landriau	9 March 2007 (aged 19)	1.78 m	8	0	(France) Tournefeuille

=== India ===
The final squad was announced on 22 May 2026.

Head coach: (India) Sachin Chaudhary

No.	Pos.	Name	Date of birth (age)	Height	App.	Goals	Club
5	RW	Pradnya Balaso Mane	2 March 2006 (aged 20)	1.59 m	0	0	(India) No club
6	P	Kanishka	28 April 2009 (aged 17)	1.76 m	0	0	(India) No club
7	LW	Swati	17 December 2006 (aged 19)	1.63 m	3	6	(India) No club
8	LW	Ridhima	26 November 2008 (aged 17)	1.73 m	0	0	(India) No club
10	LB	Garima	8 April 2009 (aged 17)	1.77 m	0	0	(India) No club
11	CB	Sujata	30 November 2006 (aged 19)	1.66 m	0	0	(India) No club
12	GK	Neha Chauhan	6 April 2009 (aged 17)	1.76 m	0	0	(India) No club
13	LW	Saumya Srivastava	6 July 2006 (aged 19)	1.73 m	0	0	(India) No club
14	CB	Amrita	25 June 2008 (aged 17)	1.59 m	0	0	(India) No club
15	CB	Lavisha Gahlawat	24 March 2008 (aged 18)	1.70 m	12	8	(India) No club
19	RB	Muskan	21 February 2009 (aged 17)	1.65 m	5	5	(India) No club
24	CB	Shivani Devi	20 March 2010 (aged 16)	1.74 m	0	0	(India) No club

=== Sweden ===
The final squad was announced on 20 May 2026.

Head coach: (Sweden) Fredrik Söderberg Wernheim

No.	Pos.	Name	Date of birth (age)	Height	App.	Goals	Club
1	GK	Tyra Börjesson	3 September 2007 (aged 18)	1.70 m	3	0	(Sweden) Skånela IF
2	CB	Selma Hestner Olsson	10 February 2007 (aged 19)	1.66 m	13	21	(Sweden) Skövde HF
4	P	Isabelle Rydén	26 November 2006 (aged 19)	1.78 m	37	91	(Sweden) Önnereds HK
5	LW	Caroline Kallio	19 April 2006 (aged 20)	1.65 m	13	40	(Sweden) Skånela IF
9	RW	Märtha Dittschlag	11 October 2006 (aged 19)	1.83 m	5	4	(Sweden) IF Hallby
11	LB	Alice Tördal	12 April 2007 (aged 19)	1.74 m	0	0	(Sweden) IK Sävehof
12	GK	Wilma Saul	5 June 2006 (aged 20)	1.85 m	32	0	(Sweden) IK Sävehof
13	LB	Ebba Börjesson	18 January 2006 (aged 20)	1.76 m	23	62	(Sweden) Ystads IF
14	LB	Hanna Lundvall	28 June 2006 (aged 19)	1.77 m	27	112	(Sweden) Skuru IK
15	P	Moa Magnusson	19 February 2007 (aged 19)	1.81 m	0	0	(Sweden) Skuru IK
16	GK	Anna Danielsson	6 July 2006 (aged 19)	1.85 m	37	2	(Sweden) Lugi HF
17	RB	Hilma Knutsson	8 October 2007 (aged 18)	1.83 m	11	16	(Sweden) IK Sävehof
25	RW	Elsa Ilvell	21 April 2006 (aged 20)	1.73 m	9	8	(Sweden) HF Karlskrona
28	CB	Klara Bergling	19 March 2006 (aged 20)	1.74 m	23	47	(Sweden) IF Hallby
32	LB	Smilla Lilja	31 July 2007 (aged 18)	1.78 m	23	43	(Sweden) H65 Höör
35	CB	Lisa Lundin	9 February 2007 (aged 19)	1.71 m	3	10	(Sweden) Redbergslids IK

== Group B ==
=== Angola ===
The final squad was announced on 21 June 2026.

Head coach: (Angola) José Chuma

No.	Pos.	Name	Date of birth (age)	Height	App.	Goals	Club
2	LB	Vilma Manuel	20 August 2006 (aged 19)	1.73 m	2	7	(Angola) Clube Desportivo 1o Agosto
3	LB	Telma Costa	12 November 2007 (aged 18)	1.58 m	0	0	(Angola) Atletico Petroleos de Luanda
6	CB	Isabel Cateco	1 January 2007 (aged 19)	1.62 m	0	0	(Angola) Clube Desportivo 1o Agosto
7	RB	Beatriz Pereira	29 June 2007 (aged 18)	1.66 m	2	1	(Angola) Casa Pessoal do Porto do Lobito
9	RB	Eliane Kessongo	15 July 2006 (aged 19)	1.61 m	0	0	(Angola) Electro Sport Clube do Lobito
10	P	Patrícia Paulino	13 January 2006 (aged 20)	1.60 m	2	12	(Angola) Sporting Clube de Luanda
11	P	Gitiane Cassoma	7 July 2006 (aged 19)	1.67 m	0	0	(Angola) Casa Pessoal do Porto do Lobito
12	GK	Daniela Neto	6 June 2007 (aged 19)	1.60 m	0	0	(Angola) Clube Desportivo 1o Agosto
13	RW	Balbina Nunda	29 October 2006 (aged 19)	1.73 m	15	53	(Angola) Clube Desportivo 1o Agosto
15	LW	Letícia Costa	24 December 2006 (aged 19)	1.62 m	0	0	(Angola) Atletico Petroleos de Luanda
20	CB	Augusta Anjos	2 May 2007 (aged 19)	1.66 m	0	0	(Angola) Atletico Petroleos de Luanda
33	GK	Elizandra Domingos	5 July 2006 (aged 19)	1.66 m	2	1	(Angola) Casa Pessoal do Porto do Lobito
77	RB	Isabel Ambrósio	24 March 2008 (aged 18)	1.69 m	0	0	(Angola) Clube Desportivo 1o Agosto
90	LB	Carla Lussende	6 February 2006 (aged 20)	1.73 m	2	2	(Angola) Clube Desportivo 1o Agosto
98	LB	Marina Alfredo	30 March 2007 (aged 19)	1.61 m	0	0	(Angola) Casa Pessoal do Porto do Lobito

=== Austria ===
The final squad was announced on 23 June 2026.

Head coach: (Croatia) Miro Barišić

No.	Pos.	Name	Date of birth (age)	Height	App.	Goals	Club
1	GK	Elena Dorfinger	16 July 2008 (aged 17)	1.75 m	6	0	(Austria) MGA Fivers
2	LB	Naomi Provin	14 December 2006 (aged 19)	1.68 m	6	7	(Austria) USV Langenlois
5	LB	Elisabeth Trutschnig	4 September 2007 (aged 18)	1.75 m	18	37	(Austria) HIB Handball Graz
8	LW	Leonie Neunteufel	4 January 2006 (aged 20)	1.67 m	40	100	(Austria) MGA Fivers
11	LW	Chiara Sieber	25 December 2006 (aged 19)	1.68 m	28	19	(Austria) SSV Dornbirn Schoren
12	GK	Nina Plavotic	28 January 2006 (aged 20)	1.76 m	56	5	(Austria) Hypo NÖ
13	LB	Leana Schieber	25 April 2006 (aged 20)	1.81 m	35	26	(Austria) HIB Handball Graz
14	CB	Rebecca Chroust	22 July 2007 (aged 18)	1.67 m	48	120	(Austria) Hypo NÖ
17	P	Rebecca Rappitsch	26 February 2006 (aged 20)	1.71 m	26	28	(Germany) SV Grün-Weiß Schwerin
19	P	Anja Preiss	29 June 2006 (aged 19)	1.68 m	33	34	(Austria) UHC Tulln
21	LB	Martina Maticevic	12 November 2006 (aged 19)	1.80 m	31	89	(Austria) Hypo NÖ
22	RB	Mathilde Thun	2 March 2007 (aged 19)	1.80 m	22	43	(Germany) HC Rödertal
26	CB	Christina Lovrinovic	5 June 2006 (aged 20)	1.67 m	26	13	(Austria) UHC Admira Wien
28	RB	Sophie Klinghofer	28 February 2008 (aged 18)	1.75 m	6	2	(Austria) Hypo NÖ
34	P	Rosa Handler	3 August 2006 (aged 19)	1.74 m	20	9	(Austria) WAT Atzgersdorf
44	CB	Melina Schweiger	22 March 2008 (aged 18)	1.70 m	6	21	(Austria) BT Füchse

=== Paraguay ===
The final squad was announced on 4 June 2026.

Head coach: (Paraguay) Wilson Alfonso

No.	Pos.	Name	Date of birth (age)	Height	App.	Goals	Club
1	GK	Alessandra Pérez	15 October 2008 (aged 17)	1.69 m	17	2	(Paraguay) Olimpia
4	RB	Melisa Parra	24 November 2006 (aged 19)	1.62 m	12	28	(Paraguay) Cerro Porteño
5	LB	María Bernal	5 November 2007 (aged 18)	1.63 m	5	0	(Paraguay) Atlético Triunfo
6	CB	Luana Figueredo	1 March 2007 (aged 19)	1.57 m	5	0	(Paraguay) Atlético Triunfo
7	P	Ayelen Almeida	17 January 2007 (aged 19)	1.74 m	12	28	(Paraguay) Atlético Triunfo
10	P	Valeria Barrios	4 August 2007 (aged 18)	1.65 m	5	7	(Paraguay) Cerro Corá
14	CB	Paula Santa Cruz	16 September 2009 (aged 16)	1.60 m	0	0	(Paraguay) International Deportivo
19	RW	Keren López	11 May 2007 (aged 19)	1.60 m	15	14	(Paraguay) Nueva Estrella
21	LB	Damarys Méndez	27 June 2007 (aged 18)	1.70 m	12	12	(Paraguay) Olimpia
26	RW	Sahary Paredes	8 July 2009 (aged 16)	1.72 m	5	7	(Paraguay) Nueva Estrella
30	CB	Fiorella Ramírez	10 April 2008 (aged 18)	1.66 m	16	23	(Paraguay) Nueva Estrella
60	RW	Carmen López	29 May 2009 (aged 17)	1.65 m	0	0	(Paraguay) Santa Elena
77	LW	Loren Torres	18 February 2008 (aged 18)	1.65 m	0	0	(Paraguay) Nueva Estrella
99	GK	Claudia Ruíz Díaz	15 September 2008 (aged 17)	1.64 m	16	2	(Paraguay) Cerro Porteño

=== Serbia ===
The final squad was announced on 26 May 2026.

Head coach: (Serbia) Zoran Barbulović

No.	Pos.	Name	Date of birth (age)	Height	App.	Goals	Club
8	P	Tara Marinović	12 September 2006 (aged 19)	1.77 m	32	39	(Serbia) ŽJRK Bor RTB
9	P	Sara Žakula	6 July 2009 (aged 16)	1.72 m	14	25	(Serbia) RK Partizan
10	P	Ema Petković	10 May 2007 (aged 19)	1.68 m	11	5	(Serbia) ŽRK Topličanin
11	RW	Mia Nedeljković	14 September 2006 (aged 19)	1.61 m	54	132	(Serbia) ORK Beograd
12	GK	Ivona Grujičić	9 May 2006 (aged 20)	1.74 m	34	2	(Serbia) ŽRK Crvena zvezda
13	LB	Lena Janković	11 May 2007 (aged 19)	1.74 m	38	28	(Serbia) RK Beograd
15	LB	Sara Radović	9 January 2006 (aged 20)	1.73 m	48	135	(Serbia) ORK Bor
18	P	Tijana Janković	23 July 2006 (aged 19)	1.76 m	15	6	(Serbia) RK Partizan
19	CB	Leana Milosavljević	19 June 2007 (aged 19)	1.75 m	27	41	(France) Stella Saint-Maur Handball
22	CB	Milica Otašević	19 May 2007 (aged 19)	1.70 m	46	91	(Serbia) ŽRK Železničar
23	LB	Tamara Dušić	23 October 2009 (aged 16)	1.74 m	13	47	(Serbia) RK Junior
26	GK	Jana Tanović	26 July 2007 (aged 18)	1.73 m	29	1	(Serbia) RK Beograd
44	LW	Mia Đekić	4 February 2008 (aged 18)	1.75 m	38	59	(Serbia) ŽRK Metalac
60	CB	Nikolina Bulatović	14 February 2006 (aged 20)	1.64 m	11	19	(Serbia) ŽJRK Bor RTB
73	RW	Zorica Ranković	11 November 2006 (aged 19)	1.63 m	34	55	(Serbia) RK Radnički Kragujevac
77	RB	Lara Stanić	23 March 2006 (aged 20)	1.66 m	29	74	(Croatia) RK Lokomotiva Zagreb
91	GK	Tatjana Činku	10 February 2006 (aged 20)	1.80 m	66	8	(France) Metz HB

== Group C ==
=== Brazil ===
The final squad was announced on 23 June 2026.

Head coach: (Brazil) Marlon Araújo

No.	Pos.	Name	Date of birth (age)	Height	App.	Goals	Club
2	LW	Caroline Nery	7 May 2007 (aged 19)	1.74 m	0	0	(Brazil) Handebol Maringá
5	RW	Ana Nunes	9 January 2006 (aged 20)	1.65 m	12	29	(Brazil) Clube Português do Recife
6	RW	Jisseli Silva	27 September 2007 (aged 18)	1.69 m	17	36	(Brazil) Esporte Clube Pinheiros
7	P	Lana Coelho	14 March 2007 (aged 19)	1.83 m	5	10	(Brazil) Carajás Handebol
8	P	Larissa Ferreira	12 August 2006 (aged 19)	1.74 m	0	0	(Brazil) FME Criciúma
9	CB	Lauendy Vitor	31 October 2007 (aged 18)	1.68 m	17	34	(Brazil) Esporte Clube Pinheiros
10	LB	Amanda Braga	22 February 2006 (aged 20)	1.73 m	0	0	(Brazil) São José dos Campos
13	CB	Letícia Fúculo	28 June 2007 (aged 18)	1.64 m	17	27	(Brazil) Esporte Clube Pinheiros
14	RB	Samanta Martins	3 July 2006 (aged 19)	1.58 m	5	16	(Brazil) Centro Esportivo Suzano Costa
15	CB	Giovanna Tavares	16 April 2009 (aged 17)	1.68 m	0	0	(Portugal) CSSPF
19	LB	Fernanda Pereira	3 September 2007 (aged 18)	1.71 m	0	0	(Brazil) São Caetano
20	LW	Nhauany Castro	10 March 2007 (aged 19)	1.69 m	17	25	(Brazil) Centro Esportivo Suzano Costa
21	GK	Évellyn Silva	19 January 2006 (aged 20)	1.67 m	0	0	(Brazil) Clube Português do Recife
25	LB	Raquel Ladeia	14 September 2006 (aged 19)	1.71 m	12	49	(Brazil) Clube Português do Recife
27	GK	Sophia Kieling	10 April 2007 (aged 19)	1.74 m	17	0	(Brazil) ATHB
28	P	Luana Pereira	2 March 2006 (aged 20)	1.68 m	12	22	(North Macedonia) Gjorche Petrov
31	RB	Brenda Mendes	31 January 2008 (aged 18)	1.65 m	0	0	(Brazil) São José dos Campos
37	LB	Paola Oliveira	10 August 2009 (aged 16)	1.72 m	0	0	(Brazil) ADI Itajaí

=== Canada ===
The final squad was announced on 23 June 2026.

Head coach: (Canada) Stéphane Bertheau

No.	Pos.	Name	Date of birth (age)	Height	App.	Goals	Club
4	RW	Maxim Reid	27 March 2007 (aged 19)	1.60 m	7	6	(Canada) Club de Handball de Lévis
5	CB	Ophély Chagnon	19 October 2006 (aged 19)	1.63 m	6	7	(Canada) Club de Handball de Drummondville
6	LW	Annabelle Reny	29 March 2007 (aged 19)	1.71 m	7	6	(Canada) Club de Handball de Lévis
7	CB	Amélie Leclair	25 July 2008 (aged 17)	1.72 m	7	21	(Canada) Club de Handball Champlain
8	LW	Doriane Blais	17 August 2006 (aged 19)	1.60 m	7	3	(Canada) Club de Handball de Lévis
9	P	Gabrielle Landry	21 October 2006 (aged 19)	1.65 m	6	4	(Canada) Club de Handball de Lévis
13	GK	Aurélie Bouly	23 December 2006 (aged 19)	1.60 m	5	0	(Canada) Handball Laval
14	LB	Florence Boisclair	28 December 2006 (aged 19)	1.63 m	7	19	(Canada) Club de Handball de Drummondville
16	GK	Alice Florescu	31 January 2007 (aged 19)	1.70 m	5	0	(Canada) Club de Handball Champlain
19	P	Clara Halus-Udrea	17 May 2007 (aged 19)	1.70 m	7	6	(Canada) Handball Laval
21	RB	Halyn English	21 November 2007 (aged 18)	1.60 m	0	0	(Canada) Handball Laval
22	RB	Mahély Lemaire	28 June 2006 (aged 19)	1.68 m	7	29	(Canada) Club de Handball de Drummondville
26	LB	Chloé Fournier	26 March 2006 (aged 20)	1.80 m	7	4	(Canada) Club de Handball Celtique de Montréal
33	GK	Roselyne Roy	20 October 2008 (aged 17)	1.50 m	0	0	(Canada) Club de Handball Champlain
36	LW	Petra-Sinziana Botarel	1 January 2007 (aged 19)	1.68 m	0	0	(Canada) Handball Laval
37	P	Katarina Vrdoljak	5 February 2006 (aged 20)	1.75 m	7	2	(Canada) Handball Laval

=== Germany ===
The final squad was announced on 15 June 2026.

Head coach: (Germany) Christopher Nordmeyer

No.	Pos.	Name	Date of birth (age)	Height	App.	Goals	Club
2	CB	Hannah Gutzeit	2 August 2007 (aged 18)	1.75 m	0	0	(Germany) HSV Solingen-Gräfrath
3	RW	Jana Walther	19 February 2007 (aged 19)	1.75 m	0	0	(Germany) HC Leipzig
4	LW	Lara Egeling	1 September 2006 (aged 19)	1.70 m	0	0	(Germany) Borussia Dortmund
5	RW	Farrelle Njinkeu	9 January 2007 (aged 19)	1.73 m	0	0	(Germany) HSG Blomberg-Lippe
6	RB	Aida Mittag	25 April 2006 (aged 20)	1.80 m	1	5	(Germany) Buxtehuder SV
7	LW	Chiara Rohr	6 June 2007 (aged 19)	1.77 m	0	0	(Germany) TV Hannover-Badenstedt
8	RB	Ruslana Litvinov	22 August 2007 (aged 18)	1.73 m	17	61	(Germany) HSG Blomberg-Lippe
11	CB	Lisa Lammich	14 October 2008 (aged 17)	1.70 m	0	0	(Germany) HC Leipzig
12	GK	Merle Muth	26 February 2007 (aged 19)	1.82 m	4	0	(Germany) TSV Bayer 04 Leverkusen
13	P	Aylin Bornhardt	17 November 2006 (aged 19)	1.73 m	28	80	(Germany) SG Schozach-Bottwartal
14	RB	Marleen Kern	14 January 2006 (aged 20)	1.75 m	35	66	(Germany) 1. FSV Mainz 05
16	GK	Lena Lindemann	7 January 2006 (aged 20)	1.80 m	26	1	(Germany) Bergischer HC
17	LB	Emma Niemann	26 July 2006 (aged 19)	1.70 m	0	0	(Germany) TV Hannover-Badenstedt
18	P	Laura Klocke	23 March 2006 (aged 20)	1.80 m	27	32	(Germany) HC Leipzig
20	LB	Marlene Tucholke	9 October 2007 (aged 18)	1.91 m	0	0	(Germany) HC Leipzig
21	LB	Kim Ott	17 February 2006 (aged 20)	1.85 m	25	67	(Germany) Thüringer HC

=== Romania ===
The final squad was announced on 18 June 2026.

Head coach: (Romania) Alin Oprescu

No.	Pos.	Name	Date of birth (age)	Height	App.	Goals	Club
1	GK	Beatrice Tunariu	6 July 2006 (aged 19)	1.77 m	0	0	(Romania) CS Magura Cisnadie
2	LW	Alexia Niță	21 March 2007 (aged 19)	1.65 m	47	159	(Romania) HC Zalau
4	CB	Evelyn Marton	23 February 2006 (aged 20)	1.71 m	23	39	(Romania) ACS SEPSI Sic Sf Gheorghe
5	CB	Alexandra Voicu	1 April 2006 (aged 20)	1.65 m	49	96	(Romania) CSM Bucuresti
6	LW	Daria Florentina Mihăilă	5 October 2006 (aged 19)	1.80 m	7	23	(Romania) HC Dunărea Brăila
7	LB	Mioara Ciubotaru	14 April 2006 (aged 20)	0.81 m	30	36	(Romania) HC Zalau
8	CB	Teodora Damian	9 December 2006 (aged 19)	1.76 m	52	231	(Romania) CS Minaur Baia Mare
10	RB	Gabriela Țulea	8 November 2006 (aged 19)	1.76 m	44	98	(Romania) CS Rapid Bucuresti
11	RB	Ana Martina Stan	28 May 2007 (aged 19)	1.80 m	38	69	(Romania) CS Gloria 2018 Bistrita Nasaud
12	GK	Ioana Niță	4 May 2006 (aged 20)	1.82 m	48	3	(Romania) HC Zalau
16	GK	Florentina Anastasia Roșu	10 February 2006 (aged 20)	1.78 m	13	0	(Romania) CS Rapid Bucuresti
17	LB	Anamaria Șerban	19 March 2007 (aged 19)	1.78 m	54	179	(Romania) CSM Corona Brasov
18	RB	Bianca Vintilă	8 February 2006 (aged 20)	1.75 m	5	2	(Romania) HC Zalau
20	P	Daria Uțan	18 February 2006 (aged 20)	1.71 m	7	5	(Romania) CS Gloria 2018 Bistrita Nasaud
22	RW	Sara Anamaria Trușcă	22 October 2007 (aged 18)	1.75 m	28	70	(Romania) SCM Ramnicu Valcea
37	P	Ioana Codruța Hrenaru	7 January 2006 (aged 20)	1.82 m	8	6	(Romania) CSM Iaşi 2020
59	LB	Riana Rusu	26 July 2007 (aged 18)	1.75 m	0	0	(Romania) CNOPJ Bistrița-Năsăud
84	LB	Enryka Valentina Bodijar	16 February 2006 (aged 20)	1.74 m	47	174	(Romania) SCM Craiova

== Group D ==
=== Argentina ===
The final squad was announced on 9 June 2026.

Head coach: (Argentina) Martín Duhau

No.	Pos.	Name	Date of birth (age)	Height	App.	Goals	Club
2	P	Kira Peixoto Alves	23 March 2006 (aged 20)	1.72 m	10	12	(Argentina) Ferro
4	RW	Lou Genoud	3 March 2009 (aged 17)	1.70 m	19	55	(Argentina) SEDALO
5	LB	Mara Lopez	16 April 2007 (aged 19)	1.81 m	22	13	(Spain) Elche
9	LB	Selena Maitini	9 February 2006 (aged 20)	1.80 m	17	23	(Spain) Schär Zaragoza
10	RB	Micaela Mendoza	16 April 2006 (aged 20)	1.74 m	5	2	(Argentina) CIDECO
11	RB	Milagros Schneider	30 April 2007 (aged 19)	1.76 m	7	5	(Argentina) SEDALO
13	P	Mara Ventos	11 November 2006 (aged 19)	1.75 m	17	30	(Argentina) Lanús
14	CB	Isabella Patrone	7 February 2007 (aged 19)	1.74 m	22	64	(Argentina) SAG Ballester
17	RW	Delfina Prat Moreno	3 January 2006 (aged 20)	1.66 m	0	0	(Argentina) VILo
22	LW	Catalina Losarcos	4 January 2007 (aged 19)	1.66 m	22	60	(Argentina) SEDALO
23	GK	Josefina Ferraro	5 January 2007 (aged 19)	1.73 m	17	10	(Italy) Trapani
24	RB	Helena Molina	30 October 2006 (aged 19)	1.83 m	33	110	(Argentina) Mariano Acosta
40	GK	Lola Nuñez Fridmanas	1 February 2006 (aged 20)	1.76 m	22	2	(Argentina) SEDALO
49	CB	Mailen Sokalski	13 December 2007 (aged 18)	1.73 m	22	26	(Argentina) AACF Quilmes
66	LB	Paulina Ares	10 April 2006 (aged 20)	1.68 m	0	0	(Argentina) Dorrego
67	P	Morena Tallarico	26 August 2008 (aged 17)	1.75 m	4	3	(Argentina) Luján
99	LW	Delfina Gasparri	2 September 2006 (aged 19)	1.60 m	5	10	(Argentina) VILo

=== South Korea ===
The final squad was announced on 23 June 2026.

Head coach: (South Korea) Kim Kyoong-jin

No.	Pos.	Name	Date of birth (age)	Height	App.	Goals	Club
2	RW	Shin Yee-un	8 February 2008 (aged 18)	1.61 m	7	13	(South Korea) Gyeongnam Development Corporation
9	LW	Kim Ji-min	2 February 2007 (aged 19)	1.64 m	7	33	(South Korea) Korea National Sport University
10	RB	Park Hee-won	18 September 2007 (aged 18)	1.74 m	0	0	(South Korea) Busan Bisco
13	RB	Lee A-hyun	24 August 2007 (aged 18)	1.65 m	0	0	(South Korea) Korea National Sport University
16	GK	Kim Da-in	6 February 2006 (aged 20)	1.75 m	4	0	(South Korea) Korea National Sport University
17	LB	Suh A-young	20 July 2006 (aged 19)	1.68 m	7	17	(South Korea) Gyeongnam Development Corporation
19	P	Jang Eun-seong	12 May 2007 (aged 19)	1.74 m	0	0	(South Korea) Incheon Metropolitan City
20	RW	Lee Ye-seo	8 June 2007 (aged 19)	1.65 m	7	41	(South Korea) Korea National Sport University
21	LW	Kim Bo-hyun	3 April 2006 (aged 20)	1.63 m	7	3	(South Korea) Incheon Metropolitan City
22	GK	Hong Ye-ji	11 March 2006 (aged 20)	1.73 m	0	0	(South Korea) SK Sugar Gliders
23	CB	Kim Bo-kyeong	28 October 2006 (aged 19)	1.58 m	7	20	(South Korea) Korea National Sport University
29	LB	Ku Hyeon-ji	25 September 2006 (aged 19)	1.78 m	7	25	(South Korea) Incheon Metropolitan City
30	LW	Park Chan-hee	26 November 2007 (aged 18)	1.62 m	0	0	(South Korea) Wonderful Samcheok
31	P	Choi Hyo-sung	19 February 2002 (aged 24)	1.70 m	7	19	(South Korea) Gyeongnam Development Corporation
33	RW	Yoon Byul	30 October 2007 (aged 18)	1.67 m	0	0	(South Korea) Gwangju Metropolitan City Corporation
77	GK	Go Chae-eun	23 February 2007 (aged 19)	1.80 m	7	0	(South Korea) Powerful Daegu

=== Spain ===
The final squad was announced on 16 June 2026.

Head coach: (Spain) Joaquín Rocamora

No.	Pos.	Name	Date of birth (age)	Height	App.	Goals	Club
1	GK	Goundo Gassama	23 March 2006 (aged 20)	1.74 m	13	0	(Spain) KH-7 Granollers
2	LB	Anna Ros	26 August 2006 (aged 19)	1.81 m	13	29	(Spain) Balonmano Montequinto
3	P	Kelly Fonkeng	1 September 2006 (aged 19)	1.86 m	13	29	(Spain) Replasa Beti-Onak
4	P	Libe Arruabarrena	10 October 2006 (aged 19)	1.73 m	13	10	(Spain) Replasa Beti-Onak
6	RW	Lucía Julve	1 September 2006 (aged 19)	1.58 m	13	30	(Spain) Balonmano Morvedre
7	LB	Belén Rodríguez	2 August 2006 (aged 19)	1.73 m	11	74	(Spain) KH-7 Granollers
8	P	Kadidiatou Jallow	12 August 2006 (aged 19)	1.70 m	13	13	(Spain) Caja Rural Aula Valladolid
9	CB	Martina Català	16 April 2007 (aged 19)	1.71 m	13	14	(Spain) Balonmano Morvedre
10	LB	Nerea Patiño	9 January 2006 (aged 20)	1.74 m	2	5	(Spain) Caja Rural Aula Valladolid
11	RB	Carmen Fidalgo	30 December 2007 (aged 18)	1.73 m	2	4	(Spain) Balonmano Montequinto
12	GK	Teresa Antón	23 June 2007 (aged 19)	1.71 m	5	0	(Spain) AtticGo Elche
13	LW	Lidia Bomaba	26 September 2007 (aged 18)	1.70 m	13	18	(Spain) AtticGo Elche
15	LW	Paula Lluch	1 June 2006 (aged 20)	1.74 m	13	15	(Spain) Elda Prestigio
16	GK	Udane Bernabé	3 May 2006 (aged 20)	1.71 m	13	1	(Spain) AtticGo Elche
18	RB	Eva Pérez	12 September 2007 (aged 18)	1.88 m	2	2	(Spain) AtticGo Elche
19	RW	Sara Palanqués	22 April 2006 (aged 20)	1.66 m	13	20	(Spain) Balonmano Morvedre
20	LB	Laura Rodríguez	1 August 2007 (aged 18)	1.72 m	13	4	(Spain) Balonmano Colores

=== Turkey ===
The final squad was announced on 23 June 2026.

Head coach: (Spain) David Ginesta Montes

No.	Pos.	Name	Date of birth (age)	Height	App.	Goals	Club
2	RB	Aylin Meryem Kahraman	18 July 2008 (aged 17)	1.70 m	22	46	(Netherlands) Westfriesland SEW
3	RW	Seval Bozova	28 January 2006 (aged 20)	1.70 m	40	70	(Turkey) Üsküdar Bld.
5	PV	İlayda Yüksel	1 January 2007 (aged 19)	1.77 m	34	47	(Turkey) Üsküdar Bld.
7	PV	Kübra Nur Çınar	10 October 2008 (aged 17)	1.73 m	18	25	(Turkey) Ankara Yurdum
11	LW	Sudenaz Dağlı	20 May 2007 (aged 19)	1.71 m	8	6	(Turkey) Üsküdar Bld.
13	LW	Ela Hüzmeli	1 May 2006 (aged 20)	1.65 m	26	33	(Turkey) Ankara Yurdum
14	LB	Bugu Sönmez	1 January 2006 (aged 20)	1.85 m	45	150	(Turkey) Ankara Yurdum
23	CB	Buket Seven	26 January 2006 (aged 20)	1.63 m	23	145	(Turkey) Yalıkavak
24	LB	Nazlı Kaya	5 July 2007 (aged 18)	1.74 m	13	10	(Turkey) Kepez SBK
28	RW	Sümeyye Durdu	21 February 2007 (aged 19)	1.62 m	22	10	(Turkey) Ankara Yurdum
32	PV	Sıddıka Öz	6 November 2007 (aged 18)	1.80 m	0	0	(Turkey) Aksaray Belediyesi GSK
38	RB	Azra Öztürk	16 March 2007 (aged 19)	1.83 m	25	60	(Turkey) Göztepe
41	RB	Gazel Dikme	9 December 2009 (aged 16)	1.74 m	33	75	(Turkey) Kepez SBK
43	GK	İrem Asya Lahaçlar	21 September 2009 (aged 16)	1.73 m	11	0	(Turkey) Ankara Yurdum
45	GK	Betül Yılmaz	1 January 2006 (aged 20)	1.77 m	39	0	(Turkey) Odunpazarı
61	GK	Sude Keskin	14 November 2009 (aged 16)	1.70 m	10	0	(Germany) TuS Metzingen
63	RB	Helin Su Karagözlü	30 September 2008 (aged 17)	1.79 m	52	76	(Turkey) Üsküdar Bld.
71	CB	Hande Muhcu	4 August 2006 (aged 19)	1.85 m	20	25	(Turkey) Yenimahalle Belediyesi

== Group E ==
=== Algeria ===
The final squad was announced on 23 June 2026.

Head coach: (Algeria) Mourad Ait Ouarab

No.	Pos.	Name	Date of birth (age)	Height	App.	Goals	Club
1	GK	Zineb Bousseder	23 January 2006 (aged 20)	1.66 m	0	0	(Algeria) HBC El-Biar
2	LW	Mattilda Aya Boualem	9 August 2006 (aged 19)	1.82 m	0	0	(Algeria) HBC El-Biar
5	LB	Racha Yelles	22 October 2006 (aged 19)	1.72 m	0	0	(Algeria) HBC El-Biar
6	RB	Amira Sid	31 July 2008 (aged 17)	1.74 m	0	0	(Algeria) HBC El-Biar
15	LB	Maroua Hammideche	24 July 2006 (aged 19)	1.67 m	0	0	(Algeria) Club féminin de Boumerdes
17	LB	Lina Ines Saidi	4 January 2006 (aged 20)	1.83 m	0	0	(Algeria) HBC El-Biar
18	LW	Thalya Tair	18 October 2007 (aged 18)	1.60 m	0	0	(France) HB Plan De Cuques
19	CB	Amel Sahli	19 February 2007 (aged 19)	1.63 m	0	0	(Algeria) CSM Mouloud Mammeri Tizi Ouzou
22	GK	Louiza Djermouli	3 February 2006 (aged 20)	1.79 m	0	0	(Algeria) Ess Akbou
24	LB	Meissa Zediri	17 January 2007 (aged 19)	1.82 m	0	0	(France) 92 Issy-Paris Hand
27	RB	Lylia Berkani	16 July 2007 (aged 18)	1.76 m	13	30	(Algeria) Mouloudia Club d'Alger
28	P	Amri Aya	17 February 2006 (aged 20)	1.82 m	0	0	(Algeria) Chabab Riadi Baladiat Mila
29	LW	Amel Oulghadi	17 August 2007 (aged 18)	1.70 m	0	0	(Algeria) Espérance Seddouk
30	LB	Timea Mestouri-Theodore	15 April 2006 (aged 20)	1.64 m	0	0	(France) OGC Nice Côte d'Azur HB
31	LB	Kinda Mansouri	29 January 2008 (aged 18)	1.72 m	0	0	(Algeria) FS Constantine
69	P	Jihane Lakrafed	6 June 2007 (aged 19)	1.71 m	0	0	(France) ASUL Vaulx-en-Velin
92	CB	Malak Djaider	23 October 2007 (aged 18)	1.70 m	0	0	(Algeria) AF Sétif
99	GK	Marwa Khatima Khamtache	10 August 2006 (aged 19)	1.81 m	0	0	(Algeria) Mouloudia Club d'Alger

=== China ===
The final squad was announced on 23 June 2026.

Head coach: (Hungary) Sándor Zsadány

No.	Pos.	Name	Date of birth (age)	Height	App.	Goals	Club
1	GK	Sun Yihan	30 April 2006 (aged 20)	1.86 m	14	0	(China) Shandong
3	CB	Pan Fengying	26 November 2006 (aged 19)	1.80 m	14	36	(China) Beijing
5	CB	Zhang Jingwen	28 May 2009 (aged 17)	1.66 m	7	8	(China) Jiangsu Team
6	RW	Fu Yujie	26 October 2009 (aged 16)	1.72 m	0	0	(China) Jiangsu Team
8	CB	Liang Jing	14 April 2006 (aged 20)	1.73 m	7	14	(China) Anhui
9	LB	Zhang Shuoyan	1 February 2009 (aged 17)	1.72 m	0	0	(China) Jiangsu Team
10	CB	Hu Jiaxin	19 December 2007 (aged 18)	1.65 m	7	1	(China) Anhui
12	GK	Wang Xiaoyan	1 January 2008 (aged 18)	1.79 m	0	0	(China) Jiangsu Team
15	P	Yang Yue	15 March 2006 (aged 20)	1.77 m	14	24	(China) Shandong
16	GK	Huang Sitong	20 December 2006 (aged 19)	1.77 m	16	0	(China) Jiangsu Team
21	CB	Xing Ziyan	1 September 2006 (aged 19)	1.76 m	7	14	(China) Jiangsu Team
23	LW	Zheng Yun	17 January 2007 (aged 19)	1.78 m	7	3	(China) Jiangsu Team
24	RB	Zhu Yifan	15 October 2009 (aged 16)	1.77 m	0	0	(China) Jiangsu Team
26	P	Liu Yutong	9 January 2008 (aged 18)	1.83 m	6	3	(China) Jiangsu Team
37	P	Chen Xinyu	20 July 2006 (aged 19)	1.69 m	0	0	(China) Shandong
39	LW	Sha Yiyao	9 August 2009 (aged 16)	1.70 m	0	0	(China) Jiangsu Team
55	LW	Liu Yixuan	11 November 2008 (aged 17)	1.61 m	0	0	(China) Anhui
56	RW	Cheng Yahan	6 January 2008 (aged 18)	1.69 m	0	0	(China) Jiangsu Team

=== Denmark ===
The final squad was announced on 13 May 2026.

Head coach: (Denmark) Ole Bitsch

No.	Pos.	Name	Date of birth (age)	Height	App.	Goals	Club
2	RW	Cecillie Wiking Antivakis	13 May 2006 (aged 20)	1.74 m	5	14	(Denmark) Horsens HK
3	LW	Johanne Lasthein Andersen	12 August 2006 (aged 19)	1.61 m	17	28	(Denmark) Gudme HK
5	CB	Tilde Nygaard Ulrichsen	4 May 2006 (aged 20)	1.73 m	2	1	(Denmark) Skanderborg
6	P	Emilia Arrøe Sibanda	27 March 2006 (aged 20)	1.79 m	5	8	(Denmark) Gudme HK
7	LB	Kirstine Emilie Hoppe	4 July 2006 (aged 19)	1.73 m	25	83	(Denmark) Horsens HK
10	LB	Isabella Jensen	7 September 2006 (aged 19)	1.80 m	11	36	(Denmark) Gudme HK
12	GK	Maria Dahl Koerth	10 May 2007 (aged 19)	1.78 m	10	0	(Denmark) Viborg HK
14	P	Lina Thorstein Lützhøft	28 August 2006 (aged 19)	1.88 m	8	9	(Denmark) Ikast Håndbold
15	RB	Julie Groth Persson	15 February 2006 (aged 20)	1.84 m	45	114	(Denmark) HØJ
16	GK	Freja Fonseca Nielsen	28 March 2006 (aged 20)	1.74 m	43	2	(Denmark) EH Aalborg
17	P	Laura Duevang Martens	23 October 2006 (aged 19)	1.81 m	6	3	(Denmark) Horsens HK
18	RW	Emma Høirup Rasmussen	27 February 2007 (aged 19)	1.80 m	2	1	(Denmark) Odense
20	GK	Freja Sølling Fager	23 August 2006 (aged 19)	1.80 m	10	0	(Denmark) Roskilde Håndbold
22	LW	Julie Boendorf Johansen	14 December 2006 (aged 19)	1.66 m	9	23	(Denmark) Viborg HK
24	CB	Cecilie Frydendahl Nørskov	1 July 2006 (aged 19)	1.76 m	40	124	(Denmark) Skanderborg
29	CB	Emilie Lolk Bødker	18 July 2007 (aged 18)	1.65 m	16	18	(Denmark) Gudme HK

=== Guinea ===
The final squad was announced on 23 June 2026.

Head coach: (Guinea) Titi Mara

No.	Pos.	Name	Date of birth (age)	Height	App.	Goals	Club
1	GK	Mama Camara	6 July 2008 (aged 17)	1.63 m	0	0	(Guinea) Espoir Olympique
2	LW	Mabinty Camara	12 July 2008 (aged 17)	1.62 m	7	2	(Guinea) Espoir Olympique
3	CB	Edite Sokpo	1 January 2010 (aged 16)	1.70 m	0	0	(Guinea) Espoir Olympique
4	RB	Ramatoulaye Bangoura	16 November 2008 (aged 17)	1.70 m	9	18	(Guinea) Club Olympique de Kakandé Boké
5	RW	Aïssatou Diallo	14 February 2008 (aged 18)	1.59 m	19	52	(Guinea) Gymnastic Athletic Club Kamateroy
6	P	Célestine Kolié	17 June 2008 (aged 18)	1.60 m	8	15	(Guinea) Allu Star de Fria
7	P	Maëllie Raine	4 December 2006 (aged 19)	1.63 m	0	0	(France) HBF 3M
8	LB	Fatoumata Soumah	3 January 2010 (aged 16)	1.68 m	0	0	(Guinea) Stade de Guinée
9	LB	Mariama Diallo	24 December 2008 (aged 17)	1.67 m	4	0	(Guinea) Kamsar Handball Club
10	RB	Nahan Keïta	6 October 2006 (aged 19)	1.73 m	0	0	(Guinea) Espoir Olympique
11	CB	Yarie Mansaré	1 January 2010 (aged 16)	1.66 m	0	0	(Guinea) Stade de Guinée
12	CB	Fatou Keïta	18 November 2008 (aged 17)	1.65 m	7	2	(Guinea) Tout Puissant de Guinée
22	LB	Aminata Soumah	6 April 2008 (aged 18)	1.63 m	0	0	(Guinea) Union Sportive de Guinée
23	LB	Jade Racine	4 May 2009 (aged 17)	1.63 m	0	0	(France) HBF 3M
24	LB	Djeïnabou Diallo	11 April 2007 (aged 19)	1.69 m	0	0	(Germany) DJK Tura Dümpten
26	P	Mariame Diallo	2 April 2008 (aged 18)	1.65 m	5	2	(Guinea) Horoya HC
29	P	Saran Diaby	29 August 2007 (aged 18)	1.73 m	0	0	(France) AS BTP Nice
78	GK	Boutie Diarra	10 October 2006 (aged 19)	1.71 m	0	0	(Guinea) Union Sportive de Guinée

== Group F ==
=== Czech Republic ===
The final squad was announced on 23 June 2026.

Head coach: (Czech Republic) Dušan Poloz

No.	Pos.	Name	Date of birth (age)	Height	App.	Goals	Club
2	LW	Michaela Krapková	20 January 2007 (aged 19)	1.80 m	29	65	(Czech Republic) DHK Zora Olomouc
5	LW	Claudia Rampová	1 June 2006 (aged 20)	1.79 m	62	242	(Czech Republic) Házená Kynžvart
6	RW	Tereza Pazderová	10 May 2006 (aged 20)	1.69 m	74	230	(Czech Republic) DHK Baník Most
7	LB	Viktorie Vrbková	29 January 2006 (aged 20)	1.81 m	58	79	(Czech Republic) DHC Plzeň
9	RB	Anna Chaloupková	7 June 2006 (aged 20)	1.71 m	8	3	(Czech Republic) DHK Baník Most
10	RB	Regína Matějková	5 May 2006 (aged 20)	1.65 m	55	99	(Czech Republic) DHC Slavia Praha
11	LB	Melisa Holeňáková	17 February 2006 (aged 20)	1.65 m	68	93	(Czech Republic) DHC Slavia Praha
12	GK	Adéla Chvátalová	19 April 2007 (aged 19)	1.57 m	38	4	(Czech Republic) DHC Plzeň
13	LB	Viktorie Pejšová	28 September 2007 (aged 18)	1.87 m	68	187	(Czech Republic) DHC Slavia Praha
16	GK	Monika Masaříková	9 March 2007 (aged 19)	1.63 m	11	0	(Czech Republic) DHK Zora Olomouc
19	P	Tereza Pospíšilová	26 April 2006 (aged 20)	1.76 m	69	60	(Czech Republic) HC Zlín
20	CB	Natálie Baborovská	14 March 2007 (aged 19)	1.70 m	55	57	(Czech Republic) DHC Slavia Praha
21	RB	Markéta Polanková	29 October 2006 (aged 19)	1.67 m	52	124	(Czech Republic) DHC Plzeň
22	CB	Tereza Filípková	10 March 2006 (aged 20)	1.65 m	69	301	(Czech Republic) Házená Kynžvart
25	P	Viktorie Knedlová	12 September 2007 (aged 18)	1.65 m	30	40	(Czech Republic) DHK Baník Most
26	RB	Anna Chodounská	2 December 2007 (aged 18)	1.75 m	2	0	(Czech Republic) DHC Slavia Praha
27	GK	Andrea Buchtová	5 July 2006 (aged 19)	1.72 m	38	1	(Czech Republic) Házená Kynžvart

=== Iceland ===
The final squad was announced on 23 June 2026.

Head coach: (Iceland) Halldór Haraldsson

No.	Pos.	Name	Date of birth (age)	Height	App.	Goals	Club
4	LW	Ásthildur Þórhallsdóttir	18 September 2006 (aged 19)	1.62 m	30	104	(Iceland) Valur
9	CB	Arna Eiríksdóttir	29 March 2007 (aged 19)	1.65 m	37	82	(Iceland) Valur
10	CB	Bergrós Guðmundsdóttir	5 June 2007 (aged 19)	1.66 m	30	72	(Iceland) KA/Þór
11	P	Emelía Aðalsteinsdóttir	26 September 2007 (aged 18)	1.70 m	10	7	(Iceland) Selfoss
12	GK	Sif Hallgrímsdóttir	27 January 2006 (aged 20)	1.65 m	12	0	(Iceland) ÍR
13	P	Guðmunda Guðjónsdóttir	5 July 2007 (aged 18)	1.74 m	31	32	(Iceland) Stjarnan
14	RW	Alexandra Viktorsdóttir	26 November 2007 (aged 18)	1.78 m	39	40	(Iceland) ÍBV
16	GK	Elísabet Elíasardóttir	11 May 2006 (aged 20)	1.84 m	28	1	(Iceland) Valur
17	LB	Guðrún Traustadóttir	11 November 2007 (aged 18)	1.78 m	39	69	(Iceland) Valur
19	CB	Birna Unnarsdóttir	19 January 2007 (aged 19)	1.64 m	2	0	(Iceland) ÍBV
21	P	Ásdís Hjarðardóttir	14 August 2007 (aged 18)	1.73 m	0	0	(Iceland) ÍBV
22	LB	Sara Gísladóttir	9 May 2006 (aged 20)	1.75 m	1	1	(Iceland) Fram
23	RW	Sara Fróðadóttir	12 December 2006 (aged 19)	1.68 m	10	12	(Iceland) Valur
24	LB	Inga Hauksdóttir	13 September 2007 (aged 18)	1.75 m	0	0	(Iceland) HK
26	RB	Dagmar Pálsdóttir	14 May 2006 (aged 20)	1.63 m	37	147	(Iceland) Fram
35	CB	Hulda Bragadóttir	12 July 2007 (aged 18)	1.73 m	10	6	(Iceland) Selfoss

=== Montenegro ===
The final squad was announced on 20 June 2026.

Head coach: (Montenegro) Igor Marković

No.	Pos.	Name	Date of birth (age)	Height	App.	Goals	Club
1	GK	Teodora Rončević	11 August 2006 (aged 19)	1.86 m	24	0	(Germany) Borussia Dortmund
2	LW	Sanja Andrijašević	4 December 2007 (aged 18)	1.68 m	24	41	(Montenegro) HC Levalea 2010
4	CB	Marina Dobrković	30 July 2006 (aged 19)	1.74 m	0	0	(Austria) HIB Handball Graz
7	CB	Natalija Lekić	13 April 2007 (aged 19)	1.77 m	27	37	(Serbia) ŽRK Naisa
8	RB	Ksenija Kuzman	2 June 2007 (aged 19)	1.77 m	17	27	(Montenegro) ŽRK Budućnost Podgorica
9	RB	Maja Ceklić	18 May 2007 (aged 19)	1.76 m	26	61	(Montenegro) HC Zeta
10	LW	Bojana Peličić	22 February 2006 (aged 20)	1.72 m	24	44	(Montenegro) ŽRK Budućnost Podgorica
11	P	Anđela Guberinić	14 May 2006 (aged 20)	1.77 m	25	66	(Montenegro) OTP Group Budućnost
12	GK	Lucija Jovanović	6 December 2007 (aged 18)	1.84 m	20	0	(Montenegro) ŽRK Budućnost Podgorica
13	CB	Nina Ramusović	18 July 2007 (aged 18)	1.75 m	19	59	(Montenegro) HC Rudar
14	RW	Anika Jovanović	29 November 2007 (aged 18)	1.77 m	10	12	(Montenegro) ŽRK Budućnost Podgorica
16	GK	Vanja Živković	12 May 2006 (aged 20)	1.75 m	12	0	(Montenegro) HC Levalea 2010
17	LB	Elena Mitrović	22 December 2006 (aged 19)	1.87 m	31	60	(Montenegro) OTP Group Budućnost
20	P	Ksenija Gašević	17 January 2006 (aged 20)	1.87 m	25	38	(Montenegro) OTP Group Budućnost
23	CB	Ivana Savić	2 July 2008 (aged 17)	1.88 m	8	33	(Montenegro) HC Trebjesa
24	RW	Mia Grujić	15 September 2006 (aged 19)	1.76 m	15	35	(Serbia) Železničar Inđija
26	CB	Martina Knežević	17 October 2008 (aged 17)	1.80 m	11	61	(Montenegro) OTP Group Budućnost
27	LB	Anđelina Orbović	15 January 2008 (aged 18)	1.84 m	9	34	(Montenegro) ŽRK Tivat

=== United States ===
The final squad was announced on 26 March 2026.

Head coach: (Germany) Thomas Bäckmann

No.	Pos.	Name	Date of birth (age)	Height	App.	Goals	Club
1	GK	Jana Marques	11 March 2010 (aged 16)	1.60 m	0	0	(Spain) Club de Handbol Sant Esteve
2	RB	Rafaelia Varytimiadou	16 January 2009 (aged 17)	1.63 m	0	0	(Greece) Aesx Pylaias
3	CB	Doreen Sanchez	17 November 2008 (aged 17)	1.64 m	0	0	(United States) Denver Handball
4	P	Hajnalka Penszki	20 February 2008 (aged 18)	1.66 m	24	84	(Hungary) MTK Budapest
6	LB	Ia Hannevik	23 September 2007 (aged 18)	1.70 m	31	45	(Norway) Stabæk IF
7	RW	Milia Tomlin	27 May 2009 (aged 17)	1.63 m	0	0	(Germany) TSF Heuchelheim
9	CB	Leopoldina Poerschke	13 June 2008 (aged 18)	1.60 m	0	0	(Germany) TSV Forstenried
10	RB	Isabella Da Cruz	26 February 2006 (aged 20)	1.76 m	12	8	(France) Jeanne d'Arc Dijon Handball
11	LB	Hanna Schlueter	6 February 2009 (aged 17)	1.65 m	0	0	(Germany) SG Hamburg-Nord
15	LB	Maggie Doherty Dahlloef	12 March 2006 (aged 20)	1.79 m	0	0	(Sweden) Huddinge HK
18	LB	Amelina Schulz	11 January 2010 (aged 16)	1.77 m	5	12	(Germany) Füchse Berlin Reinickendorf
19	P	Lisa Ready	5 August 2009 (aged 16)	1.75 m	0	0	(Norway) Kongsvinger IL
23	LW	Lucie Braschoss	23 May 2007 (aged 19)	1.62 m	14	33	(Switzerland) HV Herzogenbuchsee
33	GK	Brittney Coon	7 May 2007 (aged 19)	1.60 m	0	0	(United States) SoCal Handball Club
44	LW	Leya Schlaepfer	21 October 2009 (aged 16)	1.67 m	0	0	(Switzerland) GC Amicitia Zürich
66	RB	Zina Chaouch	15 September 2006 (aged 19)	1.67 m	0	0	(Tunisia) Association sportive Ennour de l'Ariana

== Group G ==
=== Chinese Taipei ===
The final squad was announced on 23 June 2026.

Head coach: (Chinese Taipei) Tan Tsung-sheng

No.	Pos.	Name	Date of birth (age)	Height	App.	Goals	Club
7	LB	Lin Yi-jun	11 October 2006 (aged 19)	1.71 m	7	6	(Chinese Taipei) New Taipei
9	RW	Lin Ling-xuan	24 October 2006 (aged 19)	1.57 m	7	7	(Chinese Taipei) New Taipei
10	RB	Lin Ching	29 October 2006 (aged 19)	1.62 m	14	56	(Chinese Taipei) New Taipei
12	GK	Lin Jui-chi	30 October 2007 (aged 18)	1.66 m	7	0	(Chinese Taipei) New Taipei
17	LB	Chao Chen-jiun	19 January 2009 (aged 17)	1.58 m	0	0	(Chinese Taipei) New Taipei
18	GK	Fu Yu-jun	1 December 2006 (aged 19)	1.74 m	7	1	(Chinese Taipei) New Taipei
19	RW	Yang Yu-xuan	20 November 2006 (aged 19)	1.56 m	7	22	(Chinese Taipei) New Taipei
24	LB	Chang Chia-i	15 November 2008 (aged 17)	1.64 m	0	0	(Chinese Taipei) New Taipei
55	CB	Lin Siang-ting	18 September 2007 (aged 18)	1.63 m	0	0	(Chinese Taipei) New Taipei
57	RB	Lin Pei-ying	15 October 2008 (aged 17)	1.63 m	0	0	(Chinese Taipei) New Taipei
58	LW	Yeh Chih-ling	26 February 2008 (aged 18)	1.60 m	0	0	(Chinese Taipei) New Taipei
59	LB	Zhang You-xuan	13 April 2009 (aged 17)	1.65 m	0	0	(Chinese Taipei) New Taipei
63	P	Lin Tsen-pei	24 May 2010 (aged 16)	1.64 m	0	0	(Chinese Taipei) New Taipei
74	CB	Chou Yu-chen	22 October 2008 (aged 17)	1.59 m	0	0	(Chinese Taipei) New Taipei
77	P	Hsu Fang-ying	4 December 2006 (aged 19)	1.69 m	14	24	(Chinese Taipei) New Taipei
81	LB	Chiang Cai-wei	10 February 2009 (aged 17)	1.73 m	0	0	(Chinese Taipei) New Taipei

=== Hungary ===
The final squad was announced on 22 June 2026.

Head coach: (Hungary) Beáta Bohus

No.	Pos.	Name	Date of birth (age)	Height	App.	Goals	Club
7	CB	Luca Vadkerti	5 November 2007 (aged 18)	1.78 m	34	4	(Hungary) PC Trade Szeged NKE
8	LW	Luca Fehér	23 September 2006 (aged 19)	1.75 m	20	3	(Hungary) Mosonmagyaróvári KC SE
16	GK	Zelda Horváth	10 July 2007 (aged 18)	1.84 m	7	8	(Hungary) Győri ETO KC
18	GK	Diána Szilágyi	24 May 2007 (aged 19)	1.79 m	18	10	(Hungary) FTC-Budapest
19	RB	Virág Fazekas	28 August 2007 (aged 18)	1.70 m	45	6	(Denmark) SønderjyskE Damehåndbold
26	LB	Noémi Kacsó	8 August 2007 (aged 18)	1.75 m	35	9	(Hungary) Váci NKSE
41	RW	Bítia Balázs	14 August 2006 (aged 19)	1.73 m	19	3	(Hungary) FTC-Rail Cargo Hungaria
47	LB	Luca Téder	31 May 2006 (aged 20)	1.77 m	3	2	(Hungary) FTC-Budapest
49	LB	Anna Szeibert	8 April 2007 (aged 19)	1.80 m	44	6	(Hungary) FTC-Budapest
55	P	Katalin Varga	10 December 2007 (aged 18)	1.73 m	10	2	(Hungary) Debreceni VSC
57	CB	Renáta Keceli-Mészáros	10 October 2006 (aged 19)	1.66 m	40	3	(Hungary) Győri ETO KC
66	CB	Polett Rédecsi	21 February 2006 (aged 20)	1.72 m	38	4	(Hungary) Győri ETO KC
67	RW	Korina Teplán	7 June 2006 (aged 20)	1.67 m	16	2	(Hungary) Esztergomi KC
73	P	Evelin Szár	23 April 2006 (aged 20)	1.78 m	30	2	(Hungary) Eger-Eszterházy SzSE
74	P	Liza Seres	4 April 2007 (aged 19)	1.79 m	25	2	(Hungary) National Academy of Handball
77	LB	Kira Kriston	7 May 2007 (aged 19)	1.75 m	35	3	(Hungary) Győri ETO KC
78	LB	Liza Pálmai	2 January 2006 (aged 20)	1.69 m	32	3	(Hungary) Váci NKSE
85	GK	Gréta Majoros	28 February 2007 (aged 19)	1.72 m	38	10	(Hungary) Debreceni VSC

=== Poland ===
The final squad was announced on 16 June 2026.

Head coach: (Poland) Marek Jagodziński

No.	Pos.	Name	Date of birth (age)	Height	App.	Goals	Club
1	GK	Joanna Kalbarczyk	7 December 2006 (aged 19)	1.77 m	0	0	(Poland) AZS-AWF Warszawa
3	P	Marta Wrzesińska	17 June 2006 (aged 20)	1.78 m	8	3	(Poland) AZS-AWF Warszawa
4	CB	Michalina Machnio	4 August 2006 (aged 19)	1.73 m	14	33	(Poland) APR w Radomiu
5	RB	Maria Mazurkiewicz	21 August 2006 (aged 19)	1.78 m	21	59	(Poland) MTS Żory
6	LW	Lena Kępka	8 April 2008 (aged 18)	1.65 m	0	0	(Poland) SPR Łukovia Łuków
8	CB	Natalia Gardian	23 February 2006 (aged 20)	1.69 m	14	46	(Poland) MTS Żory
9	LB	Julia Grzesista	11 January 2007 (aged 19)	1.88 m	21	14	(Poland) Korona Handball Kielce
10	LW	Zuzanna Krupa	30 March 2006 (aged 20)	1.70 m	21	33	(Poland) SPR Olkusz
12	GK	Nina Smelcerz	6 November 2007 (aged 18)	1.87 m	13	0	(Poland) Korona Handball Kielce
13	P	Oliwia Pawłowska	23 February 2006 (aged 20)	1.78 m	21	45	(Poland) SKS Kusy Kraków
14	RB	Maja Schlabs	5 January 2006 (aged 20)	1.78 m	8	27	(Poland) Piłka Ręczna Poznań
19	P	Inga Trochimczyk	6 October 2008 (aged 17)	1.71 m	19	31	(Poland) MKS Lublin
22	RW	Maria Biesaga	3 August 2007 (aged 18)	1.69 m	9	3	(Poland) MMKS Jutrzenka Płock
30	GK	Maria Pentek	6 July 2006 (aged 19)	1.90 m	8	0	(Poland) Start Elbląg
42	RW	Zofia Chwojnicka	25 March 2006 (aged 20)	1.74 m	21	70	(Poland) Start Elbląg
44	LB	Zuzanna Zimnicka	18 November 2006 (aged 19)	1.75 m	15	47	(Poland) KPR Gminy Kobierzyce
52	LB	Małgorzata Kanczkowska	12 May 2009 (aged 17)	1.81 m	7	6	(Poland) SPR Gdynia
77	LW	Emilia Szymańska	21 December 2006 (aged 19)	1.77 m	8	8	(Poland) SPR Pogoń 1945 Zabrze

=== Tunisia ===
The final squad was announced on 18 June 2026.

Head coach: (Tunisia) Badreddine Haj Sassi

No.	Pos.	Name	Date of birth (age)	Height	App.	Goals	Club
3	LW	Nahla Lahouel	5 May 2006 (aged 20)	1.66 m	18	22	(Tunisia) El Menzah Sport
5	LB	Doua Ben Ameur	24 April 2006 (aged 20)	1.72 m	18	80	(Tunisia) Association sportive féminine du Sahel
7	RW	May Yazidi	12 February 2006 (aged 20)	1.76 m	11	27	(Tunisia) El Menzah Sport
9	RB	Yassmine Chaabani	7 October 2008 (aged 17)	1.79 m	24	70	(Tunisia) Association Sportive d'Hammamet
10	RB	Nessma Ghoul	31 March 2006 (aged 20)	1.70 m	11	29	(Tunisia) Association sportive féminine de Mahdia
11	LB	Chaima Slama	25 September 2006 (aged 19)	1.77 m	18	26	(France) Étoile sportive colombienne
16	GK	Tasnim Abid	7 March 2006 (aged 20)	1.82 m	8	2	(Tunisia) El Menzah Sport
18	P	Yosr Mostefaoui	18 August 2006 (aged 19)	1.80 m	13	7	(France) Achenheim Truchtersheim HB
21	CB	Ranim Cherif	6 November 2007 (aged 18)	1.62 m	18	18	(Tunisia) Association sportive féminine du Sahel
25	LW	Eya Khelifi	16 August 2007 (aged 18)	1.68 m	16	17	(Tunisia) El Menzah Sport
33	GK	Yousra Louhichi	26 June 2006 (aged 19)	1.76 m	8	0	(Tunisia) Association sportive féminine du Sahel
37	CB	Lina Essaied	30 July 2006 (aged 19)	1.74 m	11	27	(France) MSD Chartres Handball
44	P	Sirine Ferchichi	21 October 2006 (aged 19)	1.72 m	18	36	(Tunisia) El Menzah Sport
76	GK	Aya Boudhaouia	16 February 2006 (aged 20)	1.72 m	17	0	(Tunisia) Association sportive féminine du Sayada
79	CB	Nour Ouni	23 December 2008 (aged 17)	1.65 m	26	113	(Tunisia) Club Africain
99	CB	Ilef Chouk	25 August 2006 (aged 19)	1.67 m	7	11	(Tunisia) Association sportive féminine de Mahdia

== Group H ==
=== Croatia ===
The final squad was announced on 5 June 2026.

Head coach: (Croatia) Vedran Krkač

No.	Pos.	Name	Date of birth (age)	Height	App.	Goals	Club
1	GK	Lara Pudić	8 March 2006 (aged 20)	1.72 m	54	2	(Croatia) ŽRK Dugo Selo '55
2	LW	Nika Ercegović	26 September 2007 (aged 18)	1.78 m	9	2	(Croatia) ŽRK Sinj
3	LB	Una Ivančić	12 December 2006 (aged 19)	1.78 m	54	11	(Croatia) ŽRK Zrinski Čakovec
5	RB	Antea Čičak	13 August 2007 (aged 18)	1.72 m	56	132	(Croatia) ŽRK Dugo Selo '55
6	LW	Lorena Rusan	23 March 2007 (aged 19)	1.66 m	13	7	(Croatia) ŽRK Dugo Selo '55
7	RW	Lucija Renić	17 April 2006 (aged 20)	1.62 m	71	190	(Croatia) ŽRK Bjelovar
11	LB	Mirna Brusić	19 April 2006 (aged 20)	1.75 m	62	100	(Croatia) ŽRK Zamet
12	GK	Nika Kraljević	17 March 2006 (aged 20)	1.84 m	69	0	(Croatia) MRK Sesvete
16	GK	Marta Turkalj	17 May 2006 (aged 20)	1.78 m	37	2	(Croatia) ŽRK Zaprešić
18	LB	Josipa Zubac	11 December 2006 (aged 19)	1.70 m	59	83	(Croatia) ŽRK Dugo Selo '55
20	CB	Tara Čović	10 October 2006 (aged 19)	1.75 m	38	57	(Croatia) ŽRK Rudar Labin
21	LB	Tara Đelekovčan	25 May 2006 (aged 19)	1.78 m	59	145	(Croatia) RK Lokomotiva Zagreb
23	CB	Gabrijela Rogošić	20 November 2007 (aged 18)	1.67 m	3	1	(Croatia) ŽRK Sinj
25	RB	Dora Dananić	16 July 2006 (aged 19)	1.74 m	38	20	(Croatia) RK Zelina
26	P	Leona Janković	10 October 2006 (aged 19)	1.70 m	6	0	(Croatia) ŽRK Zrinski Čakovec
31	LB	Lorena Marinić	25 August 2006 (aged 19)	1.68 m	12	1	(Croatia) ŽRK Dugo Selo '55
33	RB	Vlatka Josipović	26 April 2007 (aged 19)	1.73 m	6	4	(Croatia) RK Multinorm Cerna
34	LB	Jana Miklić	30 August 2007 (aged 18)	1.75 m	8	2	(Croatia) ŽRK Zrinski Čakovec

=== Faroe Islands ===
The final squad was announced on 15 June 2026.

Head coach: (Faroe Islands) Helgi Hildarson Hoydal

No.	Pos.	Name	Date of birth (age)	Height	App.	Goals	Club
2	LW	Rakul Christiansen	30 October 2007 (aged 18)	1.68 m	8	3	(Faroe Islands) H71
3	LW	Helena Dahl Magnusardóttir	6 May 2006 (aged 20)	1.70 m	13	17	(Faroe Islands) Neistin
4	CB	Arnfríð Jacobsen	7 September 2007 (aged 18)	1.65 m	0	0	(Faroe Islands) StÍF
7	RW	Joan Rúnadóttir Johannesen	3 June 2006 (aged 19)	1.65 m	21	57	(Faroe Islands) Kyndil
8	RB	Rakul Borgarlíð Joensen	27 January 2007 (aged 19)	1.65 m	21	91	(Faroe Islands) VÍF
9	CB	Ró Reginsdóttir	25 December 2007 (aged 18)	1.65 m	20	30	(Faroe Islands) Neistin
10	LB	Silja Geirsdóttir Eystberg	20 July 2006 (aged 19)	1.75 m	21	108	(Faroe Islands) Kyndil
11	P	Agatha Kjærbæk Djurhuus	11 December 2006 (aged 19)	1.75 m	21	35	(Faroe Islands) VB
13	P	Karin Leonsdóttir Kjærbæk	5 August 2006 (aged 19)	1.84 m	6	4	(Faroe Islands) Kyndil
15	RW	Mira Bendix Laursen	23 December 2007 (aged 18)	1.70 m	8	14	(Faroe Islands) Kyndil
16	GK	Gylta Djurhuus á Neystabø	13 December 2006 (aged 19)	1.75 m	36	0	(Faroe Islands) Kyndil
17	CB	Lív Rouch Ísfeld	22 January 2007 (aged 19)	1.65 m	0	0	(Faroe Islands) Neistin
18	LW	Asta Finndóttir Hansen	18 May 2006 (aged 20)	1.68 m	0	0	(Faroe Islands) Kyndil
19	LB	Eivør í Stórustovu	17 November 2007 (aged 18)	1.89 m	0	0	(Faroe Islands) Neistin
22	P	Marjun Kristina Jansdóttir	9 April 2007 (aged 19)	1.75 m	14	11	(Faroe Islands) Kyndil
51	GK	Maria Beder	1 August 2006 (aged 19)	1.70 m	13	1	(Faroe Islands) H71

=== Japan ===
The final squad was announced on 26 May 2026.

Head coach: (Japan) Shota Arai

No.	Pos.	Name	Date of birth (age)	Height	App.	Goals	Club
1	GK	Hirari Fujiwara	19 March 2006 (aged 20)	1.72 m	13	0	(Japan) University of Tsukuba
2	LB	Yui Yasugahira	23 January 2006 (aged 20)	1.68 m	20	56	(Japan) Kokushikan University
4	RW	Airi Jinno	6 March 2007 (aged 19)	1.55 m	0	0	(Japan) Osaka University of Health and Sport Sciences
5	LB	Ririko Inayoshi	20 May 2007 (aged 19)	1.66 m	0	0	(Japan) University of Tsukuba
6	CB	Haruhi Samo	21 April 2006 (aged 20)	1.66 m	14	27	(Japan) University of Tsukuba
7	P	Cocona Honda	19 June 2006 (aged 19)	1.75 m	5	10	(Japan) Kwansei Gakuin University
10	RB	Yume Matsumoto	19 June 2006 (aged 19)	1.67 m	14	71	(Japan) Osaka University of Health and Sport Sciences
12	GK	Hana Osaki	15 January 2007 (aged 19)	1.73 m	18	0	(Japan) Osaka University of Health and Sport Sciences
13	CB	Futaba Ikeda	23 July 2007 (aged 18)	1.66 m	0	0	(Japan) University of Tsukuba
14	CB	Mami Nakamura	24 August 2006 (aged 19)	1.61 m	20	75	(Japan) Osaka University of Health and Sport Sciences
15	CB	Wakana Kita	11 December 2006 (aged 19)	1.59 m	6	26	(Japan) Mukogawa Women's University
17	RB	Kaede Abe	7 September 2006 (aged 19)	1.63 m	20	40	(Japan) Tokai University
18	LW	Jurina Kio	9 September 2006 (aged 19)	1.65 m	20	85	(Japan) University of Tsukuba
19	RB	Miku Muramatsu	23 October 2006 (aged 19)	1.58 m	14	20	(Japan) Kokushikan University
20	LW	Hisaki Arakaki	3 September 2006 (aged 19)	1.69 m	4	1	(Japan) Osaka University of Health and Sport Sciences
21	GK	Mizuki Sugimoto	2 January 2006 (aged 20)	1.72 m	5	0	(Japan) Kwansei Gakuin University
22	GK	Hinako Tada	23 February 2006 (aged 20)	1.84 m	8	0	(Japan) Osaka University of Health and Sport Sciences
23	LB	Ai Nakao	27 February 2006 (aged 20)	1.76 m	19	45	(Japan) Osaka University of Health and Sport Sciences
25	P	Mao Kato	30 August 2006 (aged 19)	1.78 m	20	53	(Japan) Osaka University of Health and Sport Sciences
27	LB	Shiho Saito	15 October 2006 (aged 19)	1.71 m	12	25	(Japan) Juntendo University

=== Norway ===
The final squad was announced on 22 May 2026.

Head coach: (Norway) Axel Stefansson

No.	Pos.	Name	Date of birth (age)	Height	App.	Goals	Club
2	LB	Ada Aalstad	9 October 2006 (aged 19)	1.75 m	28	55	(Norway) Storhamar IL
4	P	Maia Matre Hagenes	1 June 2006 (aged 19)	1.71 m	47	94	(Norway) Stavanger IF
6	LW	Milla Haugerstuen Breen	16 July 2006 (aged 19)	1.76 m	47	94	(Norway) Aker TH
8	LW	Vilde Refsland	26 September 2006 (aged 19)	1.71 m	36	52	(Norway) Stavanger IF
9	CB	Sara Barbosa	26 June 2007 (aged 18)	1.74 m	31	49	(Norway) Follo HK
10	RW	Synne With	17 February 2006 (aged 20)	1.67 m	39	121	(Norway) Sola HK
12	GK	Leah Isabell Langaard	13 November 2007 (aged 18)	1.84 m	32	1	(Norway) Randesund IL
13	P	Maja Leinan	10 June 2007 (aged 18)	1.84 m	33	21	(Norway) Oppsal IF
17	LB	Edle Eik Litland	25 April 2006 (aged 20)	1.74 m	30	82	(Norway) Åsane HB
21	RW	Vanessa Bråten Gulbrandsen	21 August 2007 (aged 18)	1.68 m	35	52	(Norway) Oppsal IF
24	RB	Julie Ellingsen	19 September 2006 (aged 19)	1.78 m	35	56	(Norway) Volda HK
27	LB	Mali Halldorsson	26 May 2006 (aged 19)	1.80 m	41	147	(Norway) Oppsal IF
28	GK	Hennie Hellebust	28 May 2006 (aged 19)	1.84 m	16	0	(Norway) Glassverket IL
29	RB	Thea Ellen Löfstedt	22 December 2007 (aged 18)	1.93 m	2	1	(Norway) Oppsal IF
35	LB	Thilla Langseth	4 January 2007 (aged 19)	1.80 m	13	26	(Norway) Aker TH
36	GK	Maja Gulliksen	15 September 2006 (aged 19)	1.74 m	5	0	(Norway) Oppsal IF
