= Diocese of Lwena =

Roman Catholic diocese in Angola

Coordinates: 11.7879°S 19.9137°E

Diocese of Lwena Dioecesis Lvenana

Location
- Country: Angola

Statistics
- Area: 223,000 km^{2} (86,000 sq mi)
- Population: Total; Catholics: 539,200; 130,000 (24.1%)
- Parishes: 23

Information
- Denomination: Catholicism
- Sui iuris church: Latin Church
- Rite: Roman
- Established: July 1, 1923
- Archdiocese: Archdiocese of Saurímo
- Cathedral: Sé Catedral de Nossa Senhora da Assunção, Lwena
- Secular priests: 23

Current leadership
- Bishop: Martin Lasarte Topolanski, SDB

Map
- Moxico Province (location of the diocese) within Angola

The Roman Catholic Diocese of Lwena (Latin: Dioecesis Lvenana) is a diocese located in the city of Lwena in the ecclesiastical province of Saurímo in Angola.

== History ==
- 1 July 1963: Established as Diocese of Luso from the Diocese of Silva Porto
- 16 May 1979: Renamed as Diocese of Lwena
- 12 April 2011: Changed suffragans from Huambo to Saurímo

== Special churches ==
The Cathedral of the diocese is Sé Catedral de Nossa Senhora da Assunção (Cathedral of the Assumption of Our Lady) in Lwena.

== Bishops ==
=== Ordinaries, in reverse chronological order ===
- Bishops of Lwena (Roman rite), below
  - Bishop Martin Lasarte Topolanski (since 1 July 2023)
  - Bishop Jesús Tirso Blanco, S.D.B. (26 November 2007 – 22 February 2022)
  - Bishop Gabriel Mbilingi, C.S.Sp. (7 June 2000 – 11 December 2006), Appointed Coadjutor Archbishop of Lubango
  - Bishop José Próspero da Ascensão Puaty (16 May 1979 – 7 June 2000); see below
- Bishops of Luso (Roman rite), below
  - Bishop José Próspero da Ascensão Puaty (3 February 1977 – 16 May 1979); see above
  - Bishop Francisco Esteves Dias, O.S.B. (1 July 1963 – 13 April 1976)

=== Coadjutor bishop ===
- Gabriel Mbilingi, C.S.Sp. (1999-2000)

=== Other priest of this diocese who became bishop ===
- José Manuel Imbamba, appointed Bishop of Dundo in 2008

== See also ==
- Roman Catholicism in Angola

== Sources ==
- GCatholic.org
