= Angola Women's Handball League =

Women's handball competition in Angola

- Country: Angola
- Most recent champion: Petro Atlético (2024)
- Most titles: Petro Atlético (24)

The Angola Women's Handball League is the top tier handball competition in Angola for women.

== Summary ==
The winners since 2001 are:

Year	City	Date	Final			Third Place Game		
Year	City	Date	Champion	Score	Second Place	Third Place	Score	Fourth Place
2001	Namibe	Aug 26–Sep 07	Petro de Luanda	^{r/r}	ASA	Sporting de Cabinda	^{r/r}	Académica do Lobito
2002	Luanda	Oct 11–26	Petro de Luanda	21-18 22-21	G.D. ENANA	ASA	30-22	C.P.P.L.
2003	Luanda	Oct 25–Nov 05	Petro de Luanda	xx-xx 35-28	G.D. ENANA	Maculusso	26-25	Académica do Lobito
2004	Luanda	Oct 24–Nov 07	Petro de Luanda	^{r/r}	Primeiro de Agosto		^{r/r}	
2005	Lobito	Jul 01–12	Petro de Luanda	^{r/r}	ASA	Primeiro de Agosto	^{r/r}	Maculusso
2006	Luanda	Jul 11–22	Petro de Luanda	28-23 25-20	Primeiro de Agosto	ASA	42-31	Electro do Lobito
2007	Luanda	Aug 31–Set 09	Petro de Luanda	^{r/r}	ASA	Primeiro de Agosto	^{r/r}	Electro do Lobito
2008	Luanda	Sep 23–Oct 03	Petro de Luanda	29-30 31-23 27-21	ASA	Electro do Lobito	24-21	Kabuscorp
2009	Kuito	Sep 01–09	Petro de Luanda	29-16 29-25	Primeiro de Agosto	ASA	27-26 19-20	Electro do Lobito
2010	Luena	Sep 17–26	Petro de Luanda	^{r/r}	Primeiro de Agosto	Electro do Lobito	^{r/r}	ASA
2011	Luanda	Jun 26–Jul 09	Primeiro de Agosto	22-28 25-17 31-30	Petro de Luanda	ASA	28-25 xx-xx	Electro do Lobito
2012	Benguela	Jun 07–15	Petro de Luanda	24-19 27-21	Primeiro de Agosto	ASA	27-17 24-14	Marítimo de Benguela
2013	Benguela	Jun 20–29	Primeiro de Agosto	27-26	Petro de Luanda	Marinha	xx-xx	ASA
2014	Luanda	Aug 28–Sep 7	Primeiro de Agosto	27-25	Petro de Luanda	Marinha	22-18	Progresso
2015	Luanda	Jun 17–28	Primeiro de Agosto	34-20 24-21	Petro de Luanda	Marinha		C.P.P.L.
2016	Luanda	Jun 14–25	Primeiro de Agosto	31-20	Marinha	Petro de Luanda	24-16	Progresso
2017	Luanda	Jul 10–23	Primeiro de Agosto	23-18	Petro de Luanda	Marinha	22-19	ASA
2018	Luanda	Jul 25–	Petro de Luanda	? - ?	?	?	? - ?	?
2019	?	?	Primeiro de Agosto	? - ?	?	?	? - ?	?
2020			Cancelled in consequence of COVID-19 pandemics					
2021	?	?-11 May	Petro de Luanda	20 - 14	Primeiro de Agosto	?	? - ?	?
2022	Luanda	?	Primeiro de Agosto	? - ?	?	?	? - ?	?
2023	?	-28 July	Primeiro de Agosto	? - ?	?	?	? - ?	?
2024	?	-25 May	Petro de Luanda	24 - 23	Primeiro de Agosto	O Maculusso	33 - 31	Casa do Pessoal do Porto do Lobito

^r/r Round robin tournament.

== Participation details ==
Club
Club	2001	2002	2003	2004	2005	2006	2007	2008	2009	2010	2011	2012	2013	2014	2015	2016	2017	2018	
	7	8	6	6	6	4	5	5	8	5	6	7	8	8	8	7	7	9	
Académica do Lobito	4	?	4	?	5	⋅	⋅	⋅	⋅	⋅	⋅	⋅	7	⋅	⋅	⋅	⋅	⋅	x
ASA	2 2001	3 2002	5	?	2 2005	3 2006	2 2007	2 2008	3 2009	4	3 2011	3 2012	4	5	7	5	4	⋅	x
C.P.P.L.	5	4	⋅	?	6	⋅	⋅	⋅	⋅	⋅	⋅	⋅	⋅	6	4	6	5	⋅	x
Desportivo da ENANA	⋅	2 2002	2 2003	⋅	⋅	⋅	⋅	⋅	⋅	⋅	⋅	⋅	⋅	⋅	⋅	⋅	⋅	⋅	2
Desportivo do Maculusso	⋅	?	3 2003	?	4	⋅	⋅	⋅	⋅	⋅	⋅	⋅	⋅	⋅	⋅	⋅	⋅	⋅	x
Electro do Lobito	⋅	⋅	⋅	⋅	⋅	4	4	3 2008	4	3 2010	4	5	6	7	6	7	6	⋅	x
Ferroviário de Luanda	⋅	⋅	⋅	⋅	⋅	⋅	⋅	⋅	6	5	6	⋅	⋅	⋅	⋅	⋅	⋅	⋅	x
Kabuscorp	⋅	⋅	⋅	⋅	⋅	⋅	5	4	5	⋅	⋅	⋅	⋅	8	⋅	⋅	⋅	⋅	x
Marinha de Guerra	⋅	⋅	⋅	⋅	⋅	⋅	⋅	⋅	5	⋅	⋅	6	3 2013	3 2014	3 2015	2 2016	3 2017	⋅	x
Marítimo de Benguela	⋅	⋅	⋅	⋅	⋅	⋅	⋅	⋅	⋅	⋅	5	4	⋅	⋅	⋅	⋅	⋅	⋅	x
Misto do Lobito	⋅	⋅	⋅	⋅	⋅	⋅	⋅	⋅	8	⋅	⋅	⋅	⋅	⋅	⋅	⋅	⋅	⋅	x
Nacional de Benguela	⋅	⋅	⋅	⋅	⋅	⋅	⋅	⋅	⋅	⋅	⋅	⋅	8	⋅	⋅	⋅	⋅	⋅	x
Petro de Luanda	1 2001	1 2002	1 2003	1 2004	1 2005	1 2006	1 2007	1 2008	1 2009	1 2010	2 2011	1 2012	2 2013	2 2014	2 2015	3 2016	2 2017	⋅	x
Primeiro de Agosto	6	?	⋅	2 2004	3 2005	2 2006	3 2007	5	2 2009	2 2010	1 2011	2 2012	1 2013	1 2014	1 2015	1 2016	1 2017	⋅	x
Progresso da Lunda Sul	⋅	⋅	⋅	⋅	⋅	⋅	⋅	⋅	⋅	⋅	⋅	⋅	⋅	⋅	8	⋅	⋅	⋅	1
Progresso do Sambizanga	⋅	⋅	⋅	⋅	⋅	⋅	⋅	⋅	⋅	⋅	⋅	7	5	4	5	4	7	⋅	4
Sonangol do Namibe	7	⋅	6	⋅	⋅	⋅	⋅	⋅	⋅	⋅	⋅	⋅	⋅	⋅	⋅	⋅	⋅	⋅	x
Sporting de Cabinda	3 2001	?	⋅	⋅	⋅	⋅	⋅	⋅	⋅	⋅	⋅	⋅	⋅	⋅	⋅	⋅	⋅	⋅	x
# Participants	7	8	6	6	6	4	5	5	8	5	6	7	8	8	8	7	7	9	

== National Champions ==
The winners are:

Team	Won	Years won
Petro de Luanda	24	1989, 1990, 1991, 1992, 1993, 1994, 1995, 1996, 1997, 1999, 2000, 2001, 2002, 2003, 2004, 2005, 2006, 2007, 2008, 2009, 2010, 2012, 2018, 2021, 2024
Ferroviário de Luanda	9	1979, 1981, 1982, 1983, 1984, 1985, 1986, 1987, 1988
Primeiro de Agosto	9	2011, 2013, 2014, 2015, 2016, 2017, 2019, 2022, 2023
ASA	1	1998
Educação de Benguela	1	1980

== See also ==
- Federação Angolana de Andebol
- Angola women's national handball team
