= Casa do Pessoal do Porto do Lobito =

Casa do Pessoal do Porto do Lobito may refer to:

- Casa do Pessoal do Porto do Lobito (basketball)
- Casa do Pessoal do Porto do Lobito (handball)
