= Onze Bravos do Malembo =

Angolan football club

11 Bravos de Malembo
- Full name: Clube Desportivo Onze Bravos do Malembo
- Nickname(s): Os Tubarões
- Founded: 10 August 1973
- Ground: Malembo, Cabinda Province, Angola
- Chairman: José Afonso Congo
- Manager: Ben Issambo
- League: APF Provincial de Futebol de Cabinda

Onze Bravos do Malembo is an Angolan football club based in the town of Malembo, Cabinda Province, Angola.

The women's team was several times provincial champion of Cabinda.

They played in the Angolan women's national championship, held from December 13 to 21, 2008, in Luena, Moxico Province, and placed 4th among twelve teams.
