= Pedro Luís António =

Roman Catholic prelate

- Bishop of Diocese of Kwito-Bié Emeritus
- Church: Roman Catholic Church
- See: Diocese of Kwito-Bié
- In office: 1979 - 1997
- Predecessor: Manuel António Pires
- Successor: José Nambi

Orders
- Ordination: 20 July 1952

Personal details
- Born: 13 January 1921 Caconda, Angola
- Died: 25 July 2014 (aged 93)

Pedro Luís António (13 January 1921 – 25 July 2014) was an Angolan prelate of the Roman Catholic Church.

António was born in Caconda, Angola and ordained a priest on 20 July 1952. António was appointed Bishop of the Diocese of Kwito-Bié on 15 June 1979 and ordained bishop on 29 July 1979. António served The Diocese of Kwito-Bié until his retirement on 15 January 1997.
