= Diocese of Dundo =

Catholic ecclesiastical territory in Angola

Coordinates: 7.3762°S 20.8353°E

Diocese of Dundo Dioecesis Dundensis

Location
- Country: Angola
- Metropolitan: Saurímo

Information
- Denomination: Catholic Church
- Sui iuris church: Latin Church
- Rite: Roman Rite
- Cathedral: Sé Catedral de Nossa Senhora da Conceiçao

Current leadership
- Pope: Leo XIV
- Bishop: Estanislau Marques Chindekasse, S.V.D.

The Diocese of Dundo (Latin: Dioecesis Dundensis) is a Latin Catholic ecclesiastical territory or diocese of the Catholic Church in Angola. In 2016, it had 366,700 baptised out of 800,000 inhabitants. It is governed by Bishop Estanislau Marques Chindekasse S.V.D. Its episcopal see is the city of Dundo. The Diocese of Dundo is a suffragan diocese in the ecclesiastical province of the metropolitan Archdiocese of Saurímo in Angola.

== Lands ==
The episcopal see is the city of Dundo, where the cathedra is found in the Cathedral of Our Lady of the Immaculate Conception. The territory is divided into 10 parishes.

== History ==
- On 9 November 2001, the diocese was erected from territory of the Roman Catholic Diocese of Saurimo (today an archdiocese). It was originally a suffragan of the Archdiocese of Luanda.
- On 12 April 2011, it became part of the ecclesiastical province of the archdiocese of Saurimo.

== Leadership ==
- Bishops of Dundo (Roman rite), in reverse chronological order
  - Bishop Estanislau Marques Chindekasse, S.V.D. (since 22 December 2012)
  - Bishop José Manuel Imbamba (6 October 2008 – 12 April 2011), appointed Archbishop of Saurimo
  - Bishop Joaquim Ferreira Lopes, O.F.M. Cap. (9 November 2001 – 6 June 2007), appointed Bishop of Viana

== Statistics ==
Year	Population			Priests				Deacons	Religious		Parishes
Year	Baptised	Total	%	Number	Secular	Regular	Baptised for priesthood	Deacons	Men	Women	Parishes
2001	70.000	700.000	10,0	7	2	5	10.000		5	9	1
2002	70.000	700.000	10,0	5		5	14.000		6	10	1
2003	71.000	701.000	10,1	5	1	4	14.200		6	13	2
2004	71.000	701.000	10,1	6	1	5	11.833		6	13	4
2006	200.000	746.000	26,8	6	1	5	33.333		6	16	5
2013	350.099	849.000	41,2	10	3	7	35.009		7	17	9
2016	366.700	800.000	45,8	16	7	9	22.918		13	26	10

== See also ==
- Roman Catholicism in Angola

== Sources ==
- GCatholic.org
