= Diocese of Kwito-Bié =

Roman Catholic diocese in Angola

Coordinates: 12.3843°S 16.9441°E

Diocese of Kwito-Bié Dioecesis Kvitobiensis Diocese do Kwito-Bié

Location
- Country: Angola
- Metropolitan: Huambo

Statistics
- Area: 71,000 km^{2} (27,000 sq mi)
- Population: Total; Catholics: (as of 2015); 1,910,000; 900,000 (47%)

Information
- Sui iuris church: Latin Church
- Rite: Roman Rite
- Established: September 4, 1940; 85 years ago

Current leadership
- Pope: Leo XIV
- Bishop: Vicente Sanombo

The Roman Catholic Diocese of Kwito-Bié (Latin: Dioecesis Kvitobiensis) is a diocese located in Bié Province in the ecclesiastical province of Huambo in Angola. The cathedral is located in the city of Cuito.

== History ==
The diocese was established on 4 September 1940 as the Diocese of Silva Porto on territory separated from the Diocese of São Paulo de Loanda. Initially, the diocese was a suffragan of the Roman Catholic Archdiocese of Luanda. The diocese lost territory on 25 November 1957 to establish the Roman Catholic Diocese of Malanje and on 1 July 1963 to establish the Diocese of Luso.

On 3 February 1977, the diocese changed suffragans to the Archdiocese of Huambo. On 16 May 1979, it was renamed as the Diocese of Kwito-Bié.

== Special churches ==
The Cathedral of the diocese is Sé Catedral de São Lourenço in Cuito, Bié Province.

== Bishops ==
=== Ordinaries, in reverse chronological order ===
==== Bishops of Kwito-Bié ====
- Bishop Vicente Sanombo (28 March 2024 – )
- Bishop José Nambi (15 January 1997 – 31 October 2022)
- Bishop Pedro Luís António (15 June 1979 – 15 January 1997)
- Bishop Manuel António Pires (16 May 1979 – 15 June 1979); see below

==== Bishops of Silva Porto ====
- Bishop Manuel António Pires (23 September 1958 – 16 May 1979); see above
- Bishop Antonio Ildefonse dos Santos Silva, O.S.B. (3 November 1941 – 17 August 1958)

=== Coadjutor bishops ===
- Manuel António Pires (1955-1958)
- José Nambi (1995-1997)

== See also ==
- Roman Catholicism in Angola

== Sources ==
- GCatholic.org
- "Diocese of Kwito-Bié". Catholic-Hierarchy.org. David M. Cheney.
