= Jesús Tirso Blanco =

Argentinian priest (1957–2022)

- S.D.B.
- Church: Catholic Church
- Diocese: Diocese of Lwena
- In office: 26 November 2007 – 22 February 2022
- Predecessor: Gabriel Mbilingi
- Successor: Martin Lasarte Topolanski

Orders
- Ordination: 28 September 1985
- Consecration: 2 March 2008 by Zacarias Kamwenho

Personal details
- Born: 3 June 1957 Ramos Mejía, Buenos Aires Province, Argentina
- Died: 22 February 2022 (aged 64) Negrar di Valpolicella, Veneto, Italy

Jesús Tirso Blanco (3 June 1957 – 22 February 2022) was an Argentine Roman Catholic prelate.

Blanco was born in Argentina and was ordained to the priesthood in 1985. He served as bishop of the Roman Catholic Diocese of Lwena, Angola from 2008 until his death in 2022. Blanco died on 22 February 2022, at the age of 64.
