= José Nambi =

Angolan Roman Catholic prelate (1949–2022)

His Excellency José Nambi
- Bishop of Kwito-Bié
- Archdiocese: Huambo
- Installed: 15 January 1997
- Term ended: 31 October 2022
- Predecessor: Pedro Luís António
- Successor: Vacant
- Previous post: Coadjutor Bishop of Kwito-Bié (1995–1997)

Orders
- Ordination: 15 August 1976
- Consecration: 17 March 1996 by Félix del Blanco Prieto

Personal details
- Born: 5 June 1949 Chinjenje, Portuguese West Africa
- Died: 31 October 2022 (aged 73) Cuito, Angola

José Nambi (5 June 1949 – 31 October 2022) was an Angolan Roman Catholic prelate.

Nambi was born in Angola and ordained to the priesthood in 1975. He served as coadjutor bishop of the Roman Catholic Diocese of Kwito-Bié in 1995 and 1996 and was bishop of the diocese from 1997 until his death.

Catholic Church titles
Preceded by Pedro Luís António	Bishop of Kwito-Bié; 1997–2022	Succeeded by Vacant
Preceded by —	Coadjutor Bishop of Kwito-Bié; 1995–1997	Succeeded by —
