= Estanislau Marques Chindekasse =

Angolan Catholic prelate (born 1958)

The Most Reverend Estanislau Marques Chindekasse
- Bishop of Dundo, Angola
- Church: Catholic Church
- Archdiocese: Roman Catholic Archdiocese of Saurimo
- See: Roman Catholic Diocese of Dundo
- Appointed: 22 December 2012
- Installed: 17 March 2013
- Predecessor: José Manuel Imbamba
- Successor: Incumbent

Orders
- Ordination: 22 November 1987 by Eugénio Salessu
- Consecration: 3 March 2013 by Gabriel Mbilingi
- Rank: Bishop

Personal details
- Born: Estanislau Marques Chindekasse; 18 August 1958 (age 67); Huambo, Archdiocese of Huambo, Huambo Province, Angola
- Motto: "Ut Vitam Habeant et Abundantius" (Come as you are)

Styles of Estanislau Marques Chindekasse
- Reference style: Your Lordship; The Most Reverend
- Spoken style: His Lordship
- Religious style: Bishop

Estanislau Marques Chindekasse S.V.D., (born 18 August 1958) is an Angolan Catholic prelate who is the bishop of the Roman Catholic Diocese of Dundo, in Angola, since 22 December 2012. Before that, from 22 November 1987, he was a priest of the Roman Catholic religious Society of the Divine Word. He was appointed bishop by Pope Benedict XVI. He was consecrated bishop on 3 March 2013. He was installed at Dundo on 17 March 2013.

== Background and education ==
He was born in Huambo on 18 August 1958. He attended primary and secondary schools in his home area. He studied at the Christ Roi Philosophy Seminary at Huambo. He studied at the Novitiate Seminary of the Society of the Divine Word in Lisbon. He then studied at the Catholic University of Portugal, graduating with a Licentiate in Theology. From 1994 until 1998, he studied at the Pontifical Gregorian University, in Rome, where he graduated with a Doctorate in Philosophy.

== Priest ==
In 1986 he took his perpetual vows as a member of the religious Society of the Divine Word. He was ordained a priest of that same religious Order on 22 November 1987 by Eugénio Salessu, Bishop of Malanje. He served as a priest until 22 December 2012.

While a priest, he served in various roles and locations, including:

- Catholic missionary in Zaire (today: Democratic Republic of the Congo) from 1987 until 1991.
- Formator at the Preparatory and Philosophy Seminary of the Society of the Divine Word Province of Viana, in Angola, from 1991 until 1994.
- Professor at the Luanda Major Seminary, from 1991 until 1994.
- Studies at the Pontifical Gregorian University in Rome, leading to the award of a Doctorate degree in philosophy from 1994 until 1998.
- Member of the General Council of the Society of the Divine Word from 1998 until 2000.
- First term as Counsellor General of the Society of the Divine Word from 2000 until 2006.
- Second term as Counsellor General of the Society of the Divine Word from 2006 until 2012.

== Bishop ==
On 22 December 2012, Pope Benedict XVI appointed Reverend Father Estanislau Marques Chindekasse, S.V.D., previously the "General Consulter" of the Society of the Divine Word, as the bishop of Dundo. He was consecrated on 3 March 2013 by Gabriel Mbilingi, Archbishop of Lubango assisted by José de Queirós Alves, Archbishop of Huambo and José Manuel Imbamba, Archbishop of Saurimo. As of 2025, he continues to serve as the local ordinary at Dundo.

== See also ==
- Catholic Church in Angola

== Succession table ==
Catholic Church titles
Preceded by José Manuel Imbamba (6 October 2008 - 12 April 2011)	Bishop of Dundo (since 22 December 2012)	Succeeded by Incumbent
