= Electro SC do Lobito (handball) =

- Full name: Electro Sport Clube do Lobito
- Short name: Electro do Lobito
- Arena: Pavilhão do Electro SC, Lobito
- Capacity: 1,500
- President: (Angola) Alcides Bravo da Rosa
- Head coach: (Angola) Alex Fernandes
- League: Angola League; Angola Cup; Angola Super Cup
- Club colours
Home	Away

Electro Sport Clube do Lobito or simply Electro do Lobito is an Angolan multisports club based in Lobito, Benguela. The club's handball team competes at the local level, at the Benguela Provincial Handball Championship and at the Angola Women's Handball League.

The club is named after its major sponsor, the Angolan Public Electricity Company.

== Honours ==
- National Championship:
  - Winner (0):
  - Runner Up (0) :
- Angola Cup:
  - Winner (0):
  - Runner Up (0) :
- Angola Super Cup:
  - Winner (0):
  - Runner Up (0) :
- CHAB Club Champions Cup:
  - Winner (0):
  - Runner Up (0) :
- CHAB Babacar Fall Super Cup:
  - Winner (0):
  - Runner Up (0) :
- CHAB Cup Winner's Cup:
  - Winner (0):
  - Runner Up (0) :

== Squad ==
Updated as of June 2016

Electro do Lobito Handball squad
Goalkeepers

 01  Ana Martins 
 12  Eugênia Ernesto Geny
 16  Verónica Calueio

Wingers

 05  Ana Ferreira
 10  Florença Capitango 22
 14  Adália Kaquissi

Back players

 02  Inácia Isaac
 03  Teresa Isaías
 04  Ednalva Valente 
 06  Marisa Varela
 07  Ácia Bacia
 09  Vamilda Quinanga

Line players

 08  Lizandra Joaquim

Other players

 15  Idrísia José
 17  Cecília Teixeira
 19  Márcia Figueiredo

Technical staff

      Alex Fernandes Head Coach 

=== Players ===
Electro SC do Lobito handball players 2011–2016

#	Name	A	P	H	W	F.X.	–	–	Alex Fernandes			–
#	Name	A	P	H	W	2011	2012	2013	2014	2015	2016	2017
#	Name	A	P	H	W	4	5	6	7	6	7	–
⋅	Acia Bacia		B			⋅	⋅	⋅	⋅	2015	7	⋅
⋅	Adália Kaquissi		W			⋅	⋅	⋅	⋅	2015	14	⋅
⋅	Ana Ferreira		W			⋅	⋅	⋅	⋅	⋅	5	⋅
⋅	Ana Martins		GK			⋅	⋅	⋅	⋅	⋅	1	⋅
⋅	Benvinda Sebastião		B			⋅	⋅	2013	2014	2015	⋅	⋅
⋅	Cecília Teixeira		–			⋅	⋅	⋅	⋅	⋅	17	⋅
⋅	Claudina Lisboa		P			⋅	⋅	⋅	2014	2015	⋅	⋅
⋅	Ednalva Valente		B			⋅	⋅	⋅	⋅	⋅	4	⋅
⋅	Eugênia Ernesto Geny		GK			⋅	⋅	2013	2014	2015	12	⋅
⋅	Florença Capitango	22	W			⋅	⋅	⋅	⋅	2015	10	⋅
⋅	Florinda Pedro Didí		GK			⋅	⋅	2013	2014	2015	⋅	⋅
⋅	Graciana Kanjala	–	–			⋅	⋅	2013	2014	⋅	⋅	⋅
⋅	Idrísia José		–			⋅	⋅	⋅	⋅	⋅	15	⋅
⋅	Inácia Isaac		B			⋅	⋅	⋅	⋅	2015	2	⋅
⋅	Lizandra Joaquim		P			⋅	⋅	⋅	⋅	2015	8	⋅
⋅	Marcia Figueiredo		–			⋅	⋅	⋅	⋅	2015	19	⋅
⋅	Maria Capilo		–			⋅	⋅	⋅	⋅	2015	⋅	⋅
⋅	Marisa Varela		B			⋅	⋅	⋅	⋅	2015	6	⋅
⋅	Ruth Varela	–	–			⋅	⋅	2013	2014	⋅	⋅	⋅
⋅	Teresa Cangombe		B			⋅	⋅	⋅	⋅	2015	⋅	⋅
⋅	Teresa Dias	–	–			⋅	⋅	2013	2014	⋅	⋅	⋅
⋅	Teresa Isaías		B			⋅	⋅	⋅	⋅	⋅	3	⋅
⋅	Vamilda Quinanga		B			⋅	⋅	⋅	⋅	2015	9	⋅
⋅	Verónica Calueio		GK			⋅	⋅	⋅	⋅	2015	16	⋅

== Manager history ==
- (Angola) José Pereira (coach)|José Pereira Kidó 2008
- (Angola) Fernando Luís (coach)|Fernando Luís 2010
- (Angola) Fernando Xavier 2011
- (Angola) Alex Fernandes 2014, 2015, 2016

== See also ==
- Federação Angolana de Andebol
