= Casa do Pessoal do Porto do Lobito (handball) =

Angolan multisports club

- Full name: Casa do Pessoal do Porto do Lobito
- Short name: C.P.P.L.
- Arena: Pavilhão da CPPL, Lobito
- Capacity: 1,500
- Head coach: Eugênio Nunes
- League: Angola League; Angola Cup; Angola Super Cup
- Club colours
Home	Away

Casa do Pessoal do Porto do Lobito or simply known as CPPL is an Angolan multisports club based in Lobito, Benguela. The club's handball team competes at the domestic level, at the Benguela Provincial Handball Championship and at the Angola Women's Handball League.

The club is named after its major sponsor, the Lobito Harbour.

== Honours ==
- National Championship:
  - Winner (0):
  - Runner-Up (0) :
- Angola Cup:
  - Winner (0):
  - Runner-Up (0) :
- Angola Super Cup:
  - Winner (0):
  - Runner-Up (0) :
- CHAB Club Champions Cup:
  - Winner (0):
  - Runner-Up (0) :
- CHAB Babacar Fall Super Cup:
  - Winner (0):
  - Runner-Up (0) :
- CHAB Cup Winner's Cup:
  - Winner (0):
  - Runner-Up (0) :

== Squad ==
Updated as of June 2016

C.P.P.L. Handball squad
Goalkeepers: 01 (Angola) Rosalina Câmara 24-165-68; 16 (Angola) Cleyze Jolo 25-170-65; Wingers: 03 (Angola) Vilma Santos 21-164-58; 05 (Angola) Florença Francisco 22-162-58; 20 (Angola) Feliciana Lukamba 23-164-69	Back players: 02 (Angola) Isabel Tchingangu 22-162-66; 06 (Angola) Ilda Figueiredo; 07 (Angola) Maura Paulo 27-165-68; 09 (Angola) Luzia Costa 25-164-63; 13 (Angola) Marta Vikuvaia 28-168-74; 15 (Angola) Eliana Cristovão 26-170-72; 18 (Angola) Helena Chibui 24-175-72	Line players: 04 (Angola) Sara Munhica 25-162-64; 14 (Angola) Marcela Paiva; Other players: 08 (Angola) Eulália Sassoma; 11 (Angola) Maria Bastos; Technical staff: (Angola) Eugênio Nunes Cuca Head Coach

=== Players ===
C.P.P.L. handball players 2011–2017

#	Name	A	P	H	W	–				E. Nunes		–
#	Name	A	P	H	W	2011	2012	2013	2014	2015	2016	2017
#	Name	A	P	H	W	–	–	–	6	4	6	–
⋅	Berta Capenda		–			⋅	⋅	⋅	⋅	17	⋅	⋅
⋅	Cleyze Jolo	25	GK	170	65	⋅	⋅	⋅	⋅	16	16	⋅
⋅	Eliana Cristóvão	26	B	170	72	⋅	⋅	⋅	⋅	⋅	15	⋅
⋅	Eulália Sassoma		–			⋅	⋅	⋅	⋅	⋅	8	⋅
⋅	Feliciana Lukamba	23	W	164	69	⋅	⋅	⋅	⋅	20	20	⋅
⋅	Florença Francisco	22	W	162	58	⋅	⋅	⋅	⋅	5	5	⋅
⋅	Helena Chibui	24	B	175	72	⋅	⋅	⋅	⋅	⋅	18	⋅
⋅	Ilda Figueiredo		B			⋅	⋅	⋅	⋅	6	6	⋅
⋅	Isabel Tchingangu	22	B	1.62	66	⋅	⋅	⋅	⋅	2	2	⋅
⋅	Jandira Loureiro		B			⋅	⋅	⋅	⋅	3	⋅	⋅
⋅	Laura Cassanga		–			⋅	⋅	⋅	⋅	⋅	17	⋅
⋅	Liliana Cristovão		–			⋅	⋅	⋅	⋅	15	⋅	⋅
⋅	Luzia Costa	25	B	164	63	⋅	⋅	⋅	⋅	9	9	⋅
⋅	Marcela Paiva		P			⋅	⋅	⋅	⋅	⋅	14	⋅
⋅	Maria Bastos		–			⋅	⋅	⋅	⋅	11	11	⋅
⋅	Marta Vikuvaia	25	B	168	74	⋅	⋅	⋅	⋅	13	13	⋅
⋅	Maura Paulo	27	B	165	68	⋅	⋅	⋅	⋅	7	7	⋅
⋅	Mayete Bento		W			⋅	⋅	⋅	⋅	19	⋅	⋅
⋅	Rosalina Câmara	24	GK	1.65	68	⋅	⋅	⋅	⋅	1	1	⋅
⋅	Sara Munhica	25	P	162	64	⋅	⋅	⋅	⋅	14	4	⋅
⋅	Valdira Kaizer		W			⋅	⋅	⋅	⋅	4	⋅	⋅
⋅	Vilma dos Santos	21	W	164	58	⋅	⋅	⋅	⋅	10	3	⋅
⋅	Virgínia Afonso		GK			⋅	⋅	⋅	⋅	12	⋅	⋅

== See also ==
- C.P.P.L. Basketball
- Federação Angolana de Andebol
