= Luena, Angola =

Luena Luso
- Municipality and town
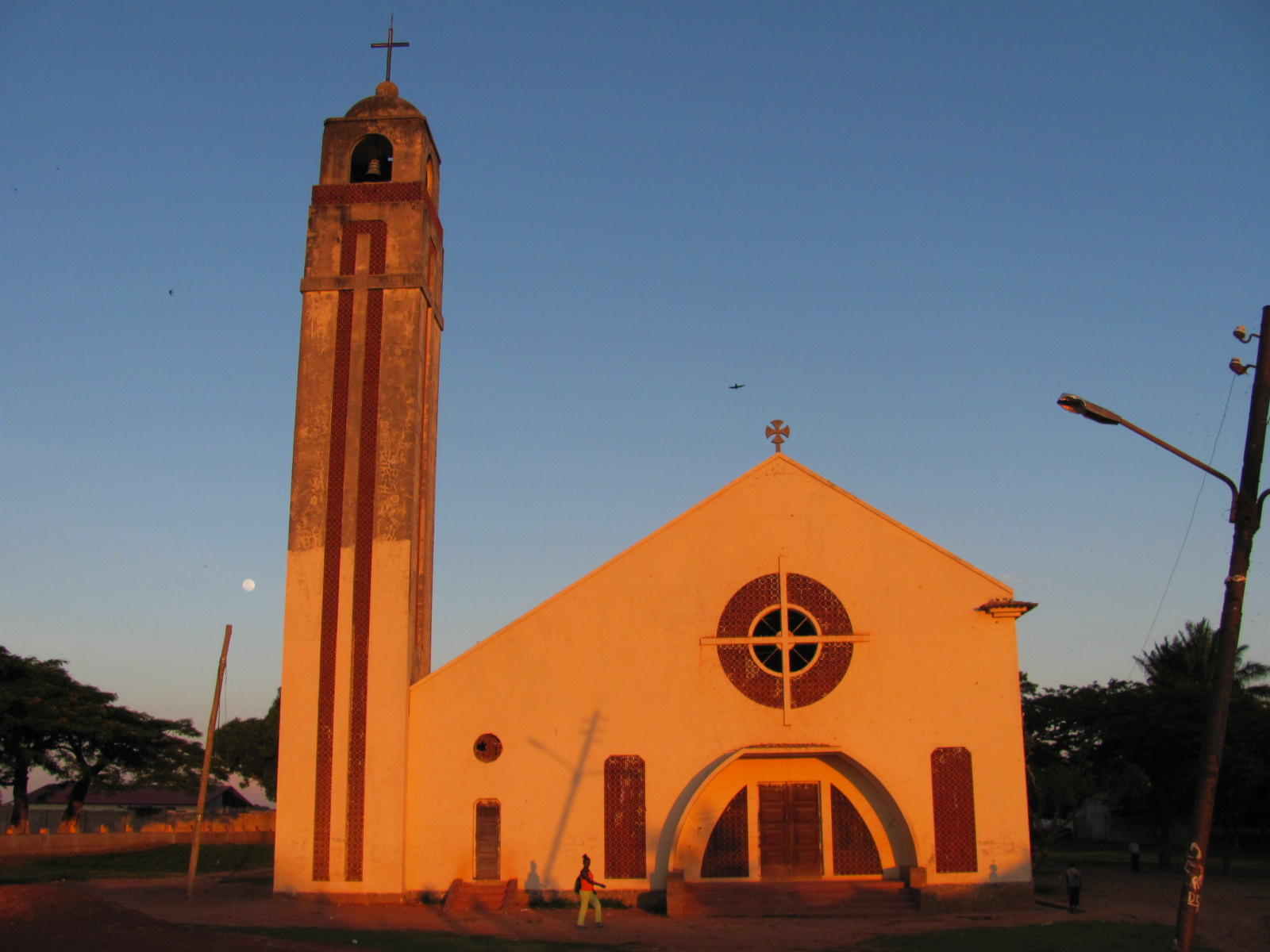
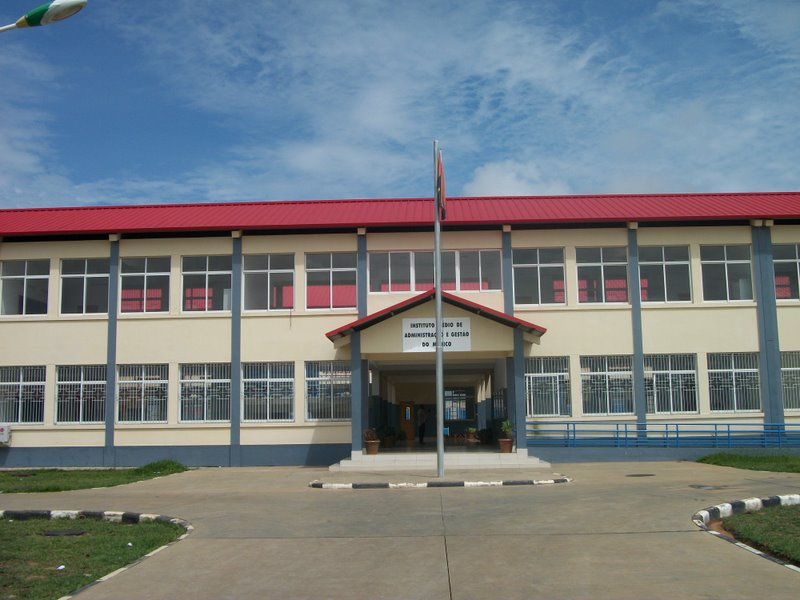
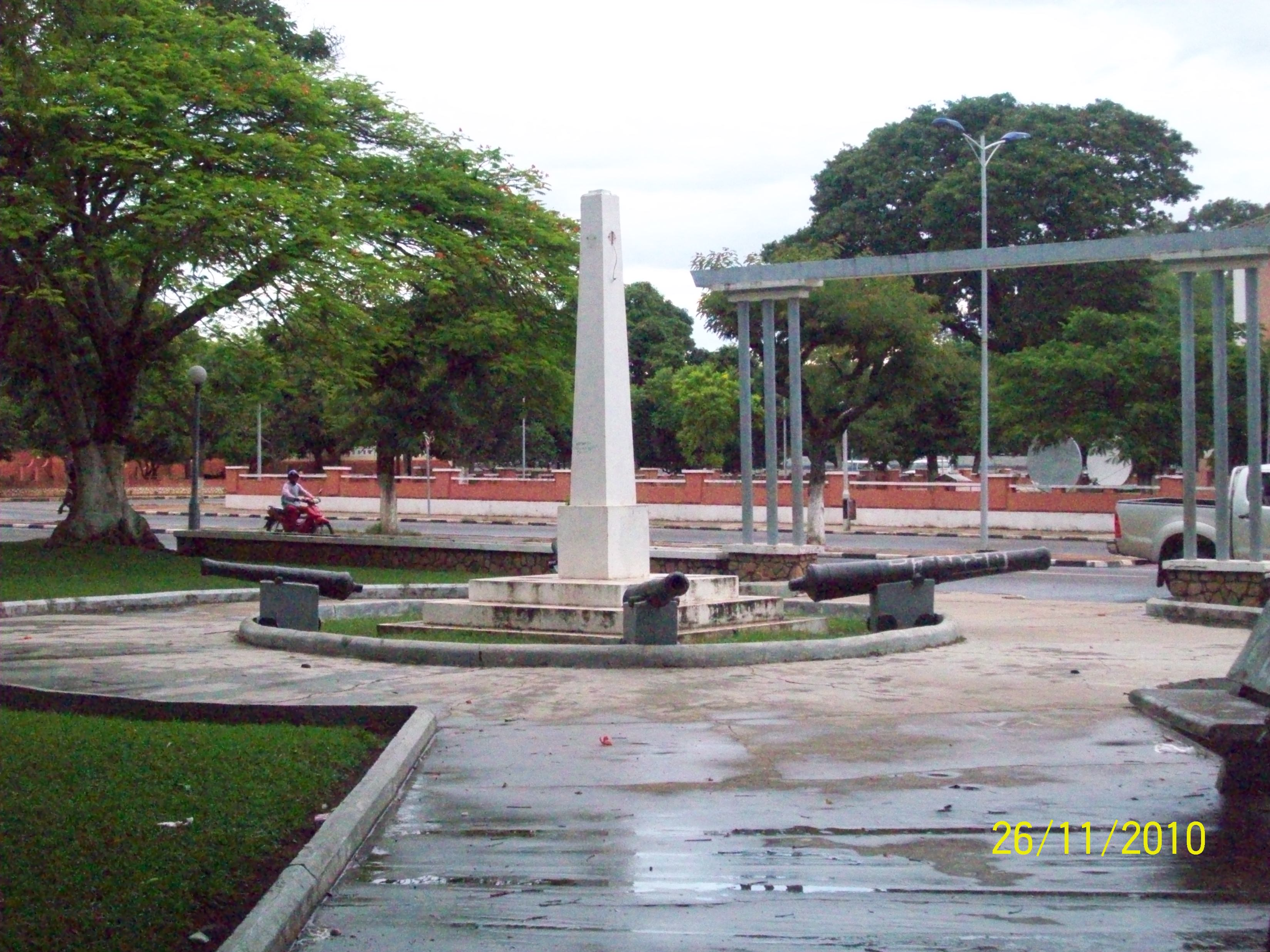
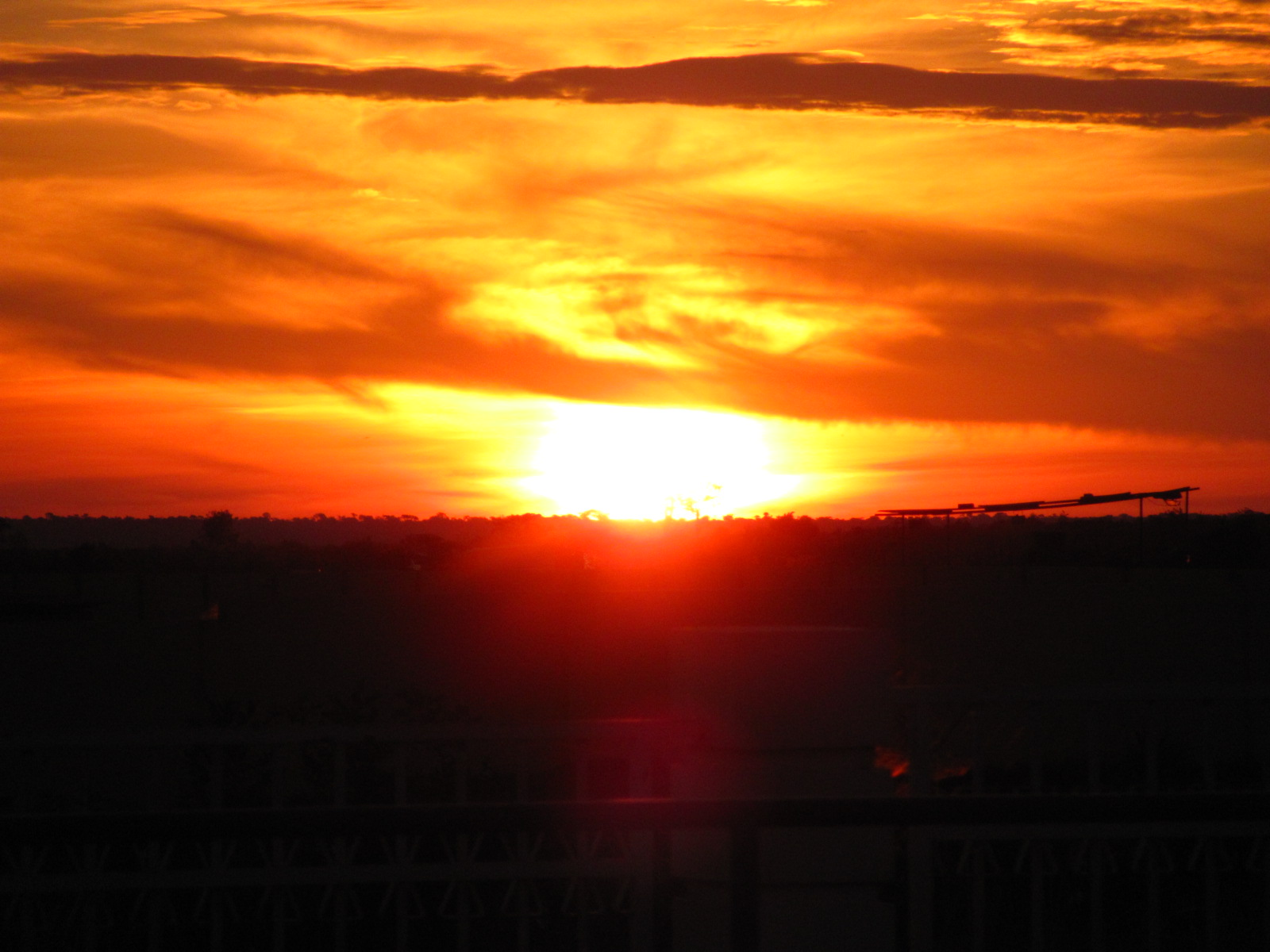

- Location in Angola
- Coordinates: 11.7918°S 19.9062°E
- Country: Angola
- Province: Moxico Province

Area
  - Total: 8,248 km^{2} (3,185 sq mi)

Population (2024 Census)
  - Total: 356,880
  - Density: 43.27/km^{2} (112.1/sq mi)
- Time zone: UTC+1 (WAT)
- Climate: Cwa

Luena, formerly known as Luso, is a city and municipality in eastern Angola, administrative capital of Moxico Province. The municipality had a population of 356,880 in 2024.

== History ==
The Angolan town is best known as the resting place of former UNITA rebel leader Jonas Savimbi, who was shot and killed by Angolan government troops on February 22, 2002. Later on January 3, 2008, Savimbi's tomb at Luena Main Cemetery was vandalised and four members of the youth wing of the MPLA were charged and arrested.

== Climate ==
Luena has a monsoonal humid subtropical climate (Köppen Cwa) bordering on a tropical savanna climate (Köppen Aw).

Climate data for Luena, Moxico Province (1940–1960)
Month	Jan	Feb	Mar	Apr	May	Jun	Jul	Aug	Sep	Oct	Nov	Dec	Year
Record high °C (°F)	32.7 (90.9)	32.4 (90.3)	32.0 (89.6)	33.4 (92.1)	32.0 (89.6)	31.0 (87.8)	30.0 (86.0)	33.5 (92.3)	35.0 (95.0)	34.3 (93.7)	34.0 (93.2)	32.4 (90.3)	35.0 (95.0)
Mean daily maximum °C (°F)	26.9 (80.4)	27.0 (80.6)	26.8 (80.2)	27.3 (81.1)	27.1 (80.8)	25.7 (78.3)	26.2 (79.2)	28.8 (83.8)	30.8 (87.4)	29.6 (85.3)	27.3 (81.1)	26.9 (80.4)	27.5 (81.5)
Daily mean °C (°F)	21.8 (71.2)	21.7 (71.1)	21.6 (70.9)	21.4 (70.5)	19.4 (66.9)	17.2 (63.0)	17.4 (63.3)	20.0 (68.0)	22.6 (72.7)	22.9 (73.2)	21.8 (71.2)	21.6 (70.9)	20.8 (69.4)
Mean daily minimum °C (°F)	16.6 (61.9)	16.4 (61.5)	16.3 (61.3)	15.5 (59.9)	11.8 (53.2)	8.8 (47.8)	8.7 (47.7)	11.5 (52.7)	14.5 (58.1)	16.2 (61.2)	16.2 (61.2)	16.4 (61.5)	14.0 (57.2)
Record low °C (°F)	11.0 (51.8)	10.7 (51.3)	12.3 (54.1)	9.1 (48.4)	3.9 (39.0)	3.1 (37.6)	2.7 (36.9)	4.6 (40.3)	8.7 (47.7)	11.0 (51.8)	11.0 (51.8)	11.5 (52.7)	2.7 (36.9)
Average precipitation mm (inches)	226 (8.9)	192 (7.6)	198 (7.8)	99 (3.9)	6 (0.2)	0 (0)	0 (0)	2 (0.1)	20 (0.8)	90 (3.5)	169 (6.7)	217 (8.5)	1,219 (48.0)
Average precipitation days (≥ 0.1 mm)	22	20	23	12	2	0	0	0	3	13	20	23	138
Average relative humidity (%)	77	77	77	71	57	47	42	39	44	61	74	77	62
Mean monthly sunshine hours	130.2	130.0	142.6	192.0	263.5	270.0	285.2	269.7	213.0	176.7	135.0	124.0	2,331.9
Mean daily sunshine hours	4.2	4.6	4.6	6.4	8.5	9.0	9.2	8.7	7.1	5.7	4.5	4.0	6.4
Source: Deutscher Wetterdienst

== Religion ==
The city is the seat of the Roman Catholic Diocese of Lwena. As of 2025, Bishop Martin Lasarte Topolanski, S.D.B. is the local ordinary here.

== Transportation ==
Luena is serviced by Luena Airport on the north side of the town.

Luena Train Station (Estação Ferroviaria De Luena) is a stop on the Benguela railway central line connecting Luau with Lobito. The station was rebuilt and features a clock tower.

== Sports ==
- Estádio Comandante Jones Kufuna Yembe - Mundunduleno (football stadium)
- Bravos do Maquis Football Club
