= Archdiocese of Saurímo =

Roman Catholic archdiocese in Angola

Coordinates: 9.6543°S 20.3918°E

Archdiocese of Saurímo Archidioecesis Saurimoensis Arquidiocese de Saurimo

Location
- Country: Angola

Statistics
- Area: 77,600 km^{2} (30,000 sq mi)
- Population: Total; Catholics: (as of 2014); 456,000; 63,815 (14.0%)

Information
- Rite: Roman
- Established: 12 April 2011
- Cathedral: Our Lady of the Assumption Cathedral, Saurimo

Current leadership
- Pope: Leo XIV
- Archbishop: Archbishop José Manuel Imbamba

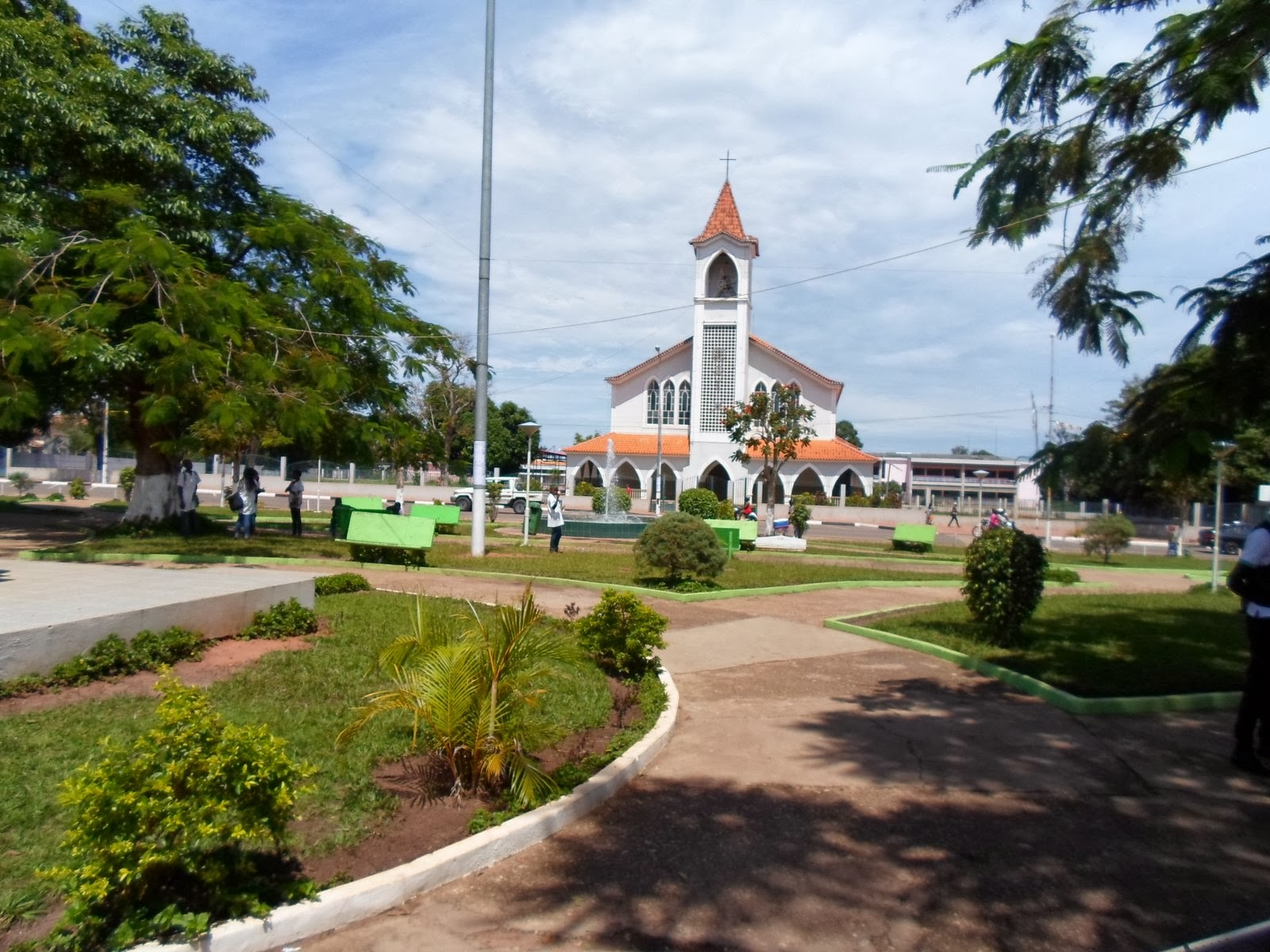

The Roman Catholic Archdiocese of Saurimo (Latin: Archidioecesis Saurimoënsis) is an archdiocese located in the city of Saurimo in Angola. Prior to its elevation to an archdiocese in 2011 it belonged to the ecclesiastical province of Luanda. It has oversight of two suffragan dioceses, which until then had been part of other Angolan Provinces, are the Diocese of Lwena and the Diocese of Dundo.

== History ==
- 10 August 1975: Established as Diocese of Henrique de Carvalho
- 16 May 1979: Renamed as Diocese of Saurimo
- 12 April 2011: Elevated to Archdiocese

== Statistics ==
The new Archdiocese, according to undated statistics released by the Vatican website because of the appointment, has a total area of 77,600 km^{2}, a total population of 420,000, a Catholic population of 61,700, 11 priests, and 28 religious.

== Special churches ==
The Cathedral of the diocese is Sé Catedral de Nossa Senhora da Assunção (Cathedral Church of the Assumption of Our Lady) in Saurímo.

== Leadership ==
Bishops of Henrique de Carvalho

- Manuel Franklin da Costa (10 August 1975 – 3 February 1977), appointed Archbishop of Huambo
- Pedro Marcos Ribeiro da Costa (3 February 1977 – 16 May 1979)

Bishops of Saurimo

- Pedro Marcos Ribeiro da Costa (16 May 1979 – 15 January 1997)
- Eugenio Dal Corso, P.S.D.P. (15 January 1997 – 18 February 2008), appointed Bishop of Benguela
  - after serving as bishop coadjutor from 1995 to 1997

Archbishops of Saurimo

- Archbishop José Manuel Imbamba (12 April 2011 – present)

== Suffragan dioceses ==
- Diocese of Dundo
- Diocese of Lwena

== See also ==
- Roman Catholicism in Angola

== Sources ==
- GCatholic.org
