= José Manuel Imbamba =

The Most Reverend José Manuel Imbamba
- Archbishop of Saurimo
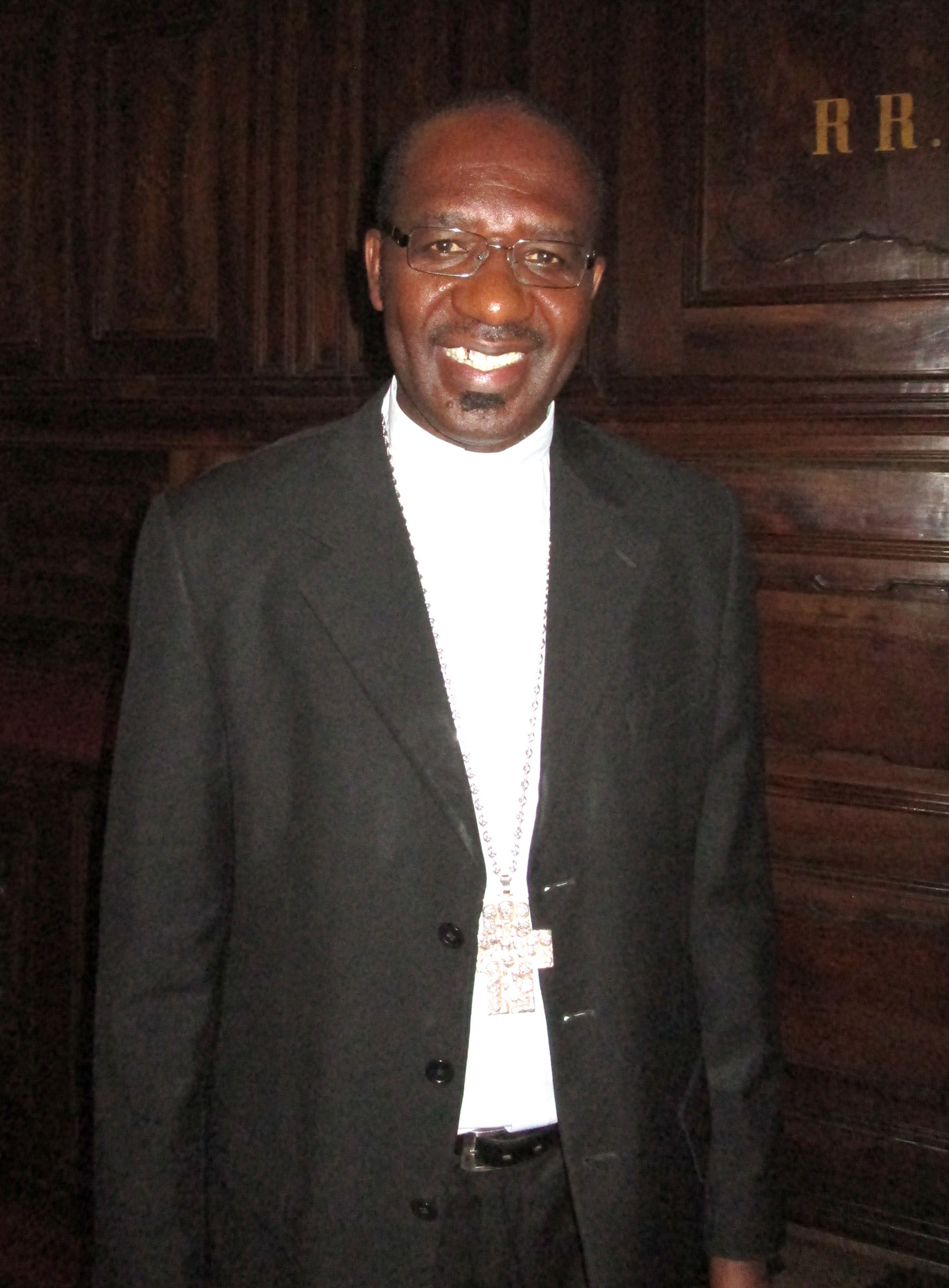
- Archdiocese: Saurimo
- Previous post: Bishop of Dundo

Orders
- Ordination: 29 December 1991
- Consecration: 14 December 2008 by Filomeno do Nascimento Vieira Dias

Personal details
- Born: 7 January 1965 (age 61) Boma, Moxico Province
- Denomination: Roman Catholic
- Education: Pontifical Urban University
- Motto: Omnia omnibus
- Coat of arms

Styles of José Manuel Imbamba
- Reference style: The Most Reverend
- Spoken style: Your Excellency
- Religious style: Monsignor
- Posthumous style: none

José Manuel Imbamba (born 7 January 1965 in Boma, Moxico Province, Angola) is an Angolan priest and the archbishop of Saurímo since 12 April 2011.

== Biography ==
Ordained as a priest in 1991, he graduated from the Pontifical Urban University in Rome in 1999.

Pope Benedict XVI appointed him as the bishop of Dundo in 2008. He was consecrated by Bishop Filomeno do Nascimento Vieira Dias on the following 14 December. On 12 April 2011 he was appointed the first archbishop of Saurímo.

From 22 to 27 September 2015 he was in Philadelphia, at the World Meeting of Families with Pope Francis.

== See also ==
Catholic Church titles
Preceded by Joaquim Ferreira Lopes	Bishop of Dundo; 2008–2011	Succeeded by Estanislau Marques Chindekasse

Catholic Church titles
Preceded by Eugenio Dal Corso	Archbishop of Saurimo; 2011-present	Succeeded by -
