= List of bridges in Angola =

This is a list of bridges and viaducts in Angola, including those for pedestrians and vehicular traffic.

== Major road and railway bridges ==
This table presents the structures with spans greater than 100 meters (non-exhaustive list).

| | Name | Span | Length | Type | Carries Crosses | Opened | Location | Province | Ref. |
|---|---|---|---|---|---|---|---|---|---|
| 1 | New Kwanza River Bridge project | 300 m (980 ft) | 626 m (2,054 ft) | Cable-stayed; Composite steel/concrete deck, concrete pylons 126+300+126 | Luanda-Benguela motorway Cuanza River | | Luanda; 9°19′27.9″S 13°09′47.5″E | Luanda Province | |
| 2 | Kwanza Suspension Bridge | 260 m (850 ft) | 420 m (1,380 ft) | Cable-stayed; Steel girder deck, steel pylons | National road EN100; Cuanza River | 1975 | Luanda; 9°19′25.2″S 13°09′49.3″E | Luanda Province | |
| 3 | Queve River Bridge project | 248 m (814 ft) | 975 m (3,199 ft) | Cable-stayed; Composite steel/concrete deck, concrete pylons 108+248+108 | Luanda-Benguela motorway Cuvo River | | Porto Amboim; 10°52′34.3″S 13°50′32.7″E | Cuanza Sul Province | |
| 4 | 4 de Abril Bridge | 160 m (520 ft) | 438 m (1,437 ft) | Cable-stayed; Concrete deck, concrete pylons 64+160+64 | National road EN100; Catumbela River | 2009 | Catumbela; 12°26′11.1″S 13°32′27.3″E | Benguela Province | |
| 5 | Kwanza River Bridge | 120 m (390 ft) | 1,534 m (5,033 ft) | Box girder Prestressed concrete 68+120+68 | National road EN110; Cuanza River | 2010 | Ícolo e Bengo–Muxima; 9°16′54.2″S 13°44′42.0″E | Luanda Province | |
| 6 | Longa River Bridge project | 106 m (348 ft) | 547 m (1,795 ft) | Arch; Steel tied arch Bow-string bridge | Luanda-Benguela motorway Longa River | | Calamba; 10°11′53.8″S 13°31′16.5″E | Luanda Province; Cuanza Sul Province | |

== See also ==
- Transport in Angola
- Trans-African Highway network
- Rail transport in Angola
- Geography of Angola
- List of rivers of Angola
- List of crossings of the Congo River

== Notes and references ==
- Nicolas Janberg. "International Database for Civil and Structural Engineering". Structurae.com.
- Others references
