= Roman Catholic Diocese of Ganda =

Roman Catholic diocese in Angola

Coordinates: 13.024475°S 14.629680°E

Diocese of Ganda Dioecesis Gandanam

Location
- Country: Angola
- Metropolitan: Huambo

Statistics
- Population: Total; Catholics: (as of 2024); 947,826; 633,636 (66.9%)
- Parishes: 12

Information
- Denomination: Roman Catholic
- Rite: Latin Rite
- Established: 1 August 2024
- Cathedral: Cathedral of St. John the Baptist
- Patron saint: Saint John the Baptist
- Secular priests: 59 (2024)

Current leadership
- Pope: Pope Leo XIV
- Bishop: Estêvão Binga

The Roman Catholic Diocese of Ganda (Latin: Dioecesis Gandanam) is a diocese located in the city of Ganda in the ecclesiastical province of Huambo in Angola. The current bishop of the diocese is Estêvão Binga.

== History ==
The diocese was established on 1 August 2024 as Diocese of Ganda from the Diocese of Benguela. It is a suffragan of the Archdiocese of Huambo.

== Geography ==
The diocese covers parts of Benguela Province, including Chongoroi, Caimbambo, Cubal, Ganda, and Tchindjendje. It covers has an area of 24.447 square kilometres (9 sq mi).

== Special churches ==
The temporary diocesan cathedral is the Cathedral of Saint John the Baptist (Ganda Angola).

== Bishops ==
=== Bishops of Ganda ===
- Estêvão Binga (since 1 August 2024)

== See also ==
- Roman Catholicism in Angola
