= Emílio Sumbelelo =

Angolan prelate

The Most Reverend Emílio Sumbelelo
- Bishop of Viana
- Church: Roman Catholic Church
- Diocese: Viana
- See: Viana
- In office: 28 April 2019
- Predecessor: Joaquim Ferreira Lopes O.F.M. Cap.
- Other posts: Coadjutor bishop of Uíge (2006–2008); Bishop of Uíge (2008–2019)

Orders
- Ordination: 4 August 1991 by Oscar Lino Lopes Fernandes Braga
- Consecration: 25 February 2007 by Oscar Lino Lopes Fernandes Braga

Personal details
- Born: Emílio Sumbelelo; 5 March 1964 (age 62) Cubal, Benguela Province, Angola

Emílio Sumbelelo (born 5 March 1964) is an Angolan prelate with the Catholic Church who is currently the bishop of Viana.

== Biography ==
Sumbelelo was born on 5 March 1964 in the town of Cubal, in Benguela province, being baptised on 11 April that same year at Missão da Hanha, belonging to the Diocese of Benguela. He did his primary studies in Catumbela from 1970 to 1975, his secondary studies from 1976 to 1981 in Lobito, and from 1982 to 1984, he attended the Seminário do Propedêutico in Benguela. From 1984 to 1986, he took courses in philosophy at the Seminário Interdiocesano de Cristo Rei in Huambo; from 1986 to 1990 he concluded classes in general theology at the same seminary. On 4 August 1991, he was ordained a priest at the Igreja de Nossa Senhora das Graças in Benguela by Dom Oscar Lino Lopes Fernandes Braga, the bishop of Benguela.

On 1 September 1993, Sumbelelo was released from his functions as the parochial priest at the Nossa Senhora das Graças in Benguela and was sent to Rome to study at the College of Canonical Law at the Pontifical Urban University where he earned his bachelor's degree. He returned to the Diocese of Benguela on 15 October 1995 when he was named the parochial priest of the Parish of Santa Cruz do Lobito, a position that he held until 1999. He was also the judicial vicar of the Ecclesiastic Court of the Diocese, the director of the Escola de Catequistas – Evangelistas "São Pedro Canísio" and professor of canonical law at the Seminário Maior de Teologia do Bom Pastor de Benguela. On 18 August 2002, he was named Ecclesiastic Assistant with the recently created Association of Catholic Jurists in Benguela. He also completed the functions of the Coordinator of the Diocesan Commission of Justice, Peace, and Migration from 1995 to 2004. From the 2002 biennale to 2004, he occupied the functions of the Coordinator of Evangelization and Catechism. Returning to Rome in 2004, he earned a doctorate in Canonical Law from Pontifical Urban University in 2006.

Sumbelelo was named the coadjutor bishop of Uíge on 1 December 2006 by Pope Benedict XVI, being consecrated on 25 February 2007 at the Capelinha de Nossa Senhora dos Navegantes de Benguela by Dom Oscar Lino Lopes Fernandes Braga, assisted by Dom Giovanni Angelo Becciu, the apostolic nuncio in Angola and by Dom José Francisco Moreira dos Santos, O.F.M. Cap., the bishop of Uíge. He took the position on 2 February 2008.

On 11 February 2019, Pope Francis transferred Sumbelelo to the Diocese of Viana, making his entrance on 28 April of that year.
