= List of city flags in Africa =

This page lists the city flags in Africa. It is a part of the Lists of city flags, which is split into continents due to its size.

== Algeria ==
Flag	Date	Use	Description
	?-Present	Algiers	
	?-Present	Oran	
	?-Present	Oued Rhiou	

== Angola ==
Flag	Date	Use	Description
	?-Present	Ambriz	
	?-Present	Bembe	
	?-Present	Bocoio	
	?-Present	Bula Atumba	
	?-Present	Catete	
	?-Present	Cazenga	
	?-Present	Cubal	
	?-Present	Huambo	
	?-Present	Lobito	
	?-Present	Quimbele	

=== Historical ===
Flag	Date	Use	Description
	?-1964	Luanda	
	1964-1975	Luanda	

== Benin ==
Flag	Date	Use	Description
	?–Present	Cotonou	a vertical bicolor of blue and yellow with a mermaid in the center.
	?–Present	Porto-Novo	a white field with the arms of the municipality in the center.

== Botswana ==
Flag	Date	Use	Description
	?-Present	Francistown	
	?-Present	Gaborone	
	?-Present	Jwaneng	
	?-Present	Kanye	
	?-Present	Lobatse	
	?-Present	Selebi Phikwe	
	?-Present	Sowa	

== Cape Verde ==
Flag	Date	Use	Description
	?-Present	Boa Vista	
	?-Present	Mosteiros	
	?-Present	Porto Novo	
	?-Present	Praia	
	?-Present	São Filipe	
	?-Present	São Miguel	

=== Historical ===
Flag	Date	Use	Description
	?-1975	Praia	

== Democratic Republic of the Congo ==
Flag	Date	Use	Description
	?-Present	Bukavu	
	?-Present	Kasumbalesa	
	?-Present	Kinshasa	
	?-Present	Kolwezi	
	?-Present	Lubumbashi	

=== Historical ===
Flag	Date	Use	Description
	1967-2011	Kinshasa	
	1960-1967	Léopoldville	

== Egypt ==
Flag	Date	Use	Description
	?-Present	Alexandria	
	?-Present	Arish	
	?-Present	Aswan	
	?-Present	Asyut	
	?-Present	Beni Suef	
	?-Present	Cairo	
	?-Present	Damietta	
	?-Present	El Hawamdeya	
	?-Present	El Matareya	
	?-Present	Faiyum	
	?-Present	Giza	
	?-Present	Ismailia	
	?-Present	Kafr El-Sheikh	
	?-Present	Luxor	
	?-Present	Minya	
	?-Present	New Alamein	
	?-Present	Port Said	
	?-Present	Qena	
	?-Present	Sadat City	
	?-Present	Shubra El-Kheima	
	?-Present	Sohag	
	?-Present	Suez	

== Equatorial Guinea ==
=== Historical ===
Flag	Date	Use	Description
	1778-1968	Santa Isabel	

== Ethiopia ==
Flag	Date	Use	Description
	?-Present	Addis Ababa	
	?-Present	Dire Dawa	

== Gabon ==
Flag	Date	Use	Description
	?-Present	Libreville	
	?-Present	Libreville (variant)	

== Gambia ==
Flag	Date	Use	Description
	?-Present	Banjul	
	?-Present	Kanifing	

== Ghana ==
Flag	Date	Use	Description
	?-Present	Accra	
	?-Present	Adenta	
	?-Present	Kumasi	
	?-Present	Sekondi-Takoradi	
	?-Present	Tamale	

== Guinea ==
Flag	Date	Use	Description
	?-Present	Conakry	

== Guinea-Bissau ==
Flag	Date	Use	Description
	?-Present	Bissau	
	?-Present	Bissorã	
	?-Present	Canchungo	
	?-Present	Farim	

=== Historical ===
Flag	Date	Use	Description
	?-1975	Bissau	
	?-1975	Gabú	

== Kenya ==
Flag	Date	Use	Description
	?-Present	Iten	
	?-Present	Mombasa	
	?-Present	Nairobi	

== Liberia ==
Flag	Date	Use	Description
	?-Present	Monrovia	

== Libya ==
Flag	Date	Use	Description
	?-Present	Tripoli	

== Madagascar ==
Flag	Date	Use	Description
	?-Present	Antananarivo	
	?-Present	Antsohihy	

=== Historical ===
Flag	Date	Use	Description
	1826-1828	Toamasina	

== Mauritius ==
Flag	Date	Use	Description
	?-Present	Port Louis	
	?-Present	Quatre Bornes	

== Morocco ==
Flag	Date	Use	Description
	?-Present	Kenitra	
	?-Present	Khouribga	

=== Historical ===
Flag	Date	Use	Description
	1925-1940 1945–1956	Tangier	

== Mozambique ==
Flag	Date	Use	Description
	?-Present	Maputo	
	?-Present	Matola	
	?-Present	Nampula	

=== Historical ===
Flag	Date	Use	Description
	?-1962	Maputo	
	1962-1975	Maputo	

== Namibia ==
Flag	Date	Use	Description
	?-Present	Oranjemund	
	?-Present	Oshakati	
	?-Present	Walvis Bay	
	?-Present	Windhoek	

== Nigeria ==
Flag	Date	Use	Description
	?-Present	Abuja	
	?-Present	Kano	
	?-Present	Lagos	
	?-Present	Zaria	

== Republic of the Congo ==
Flag	Date	Use	Description
	?-Present	Pointe-Noire	
	?-Present	Pointe-Noire (variant)	

== São Tomé and Príncipe ==
=== Historical ===
Flag	Date	Use	Description
	?-1975	São Tomé	

== Senegal ==
Flag	Date	Use	Description
	?-Present	Dakar	

== Sierra Leone ==
Flag	Date	Use	Description
	?-Present	Freetown	

== Somalia ==
Flag	Date	Use	Description
	?-Present	Abdiaziz	
	?-Present	Boondheere	
	?-Present	Daynile	
	?-Present	Mogadishu	

=== Somaliland ===
Flag	Date	Use	Description
	?-Present	Berbera	
	?-Present	Borama	
	?-Present	Burao	
	?-Present	Hargeisa	

== South Africa ==
Flag	Date	Use	Description
	2014–Present	Cape Town	
	?-Present	Durban	
	?-Present	Ekurhuleni	
	16 May 1997 – Present	Johannesburg	
	?-Present	Makhanda	
	?-Present	Pretoria	
	?-Present	Sarah Baartman	

=== Historical ===
Flag	Date	Use	Description
	?-1997	Cape Town	
	1997-2003	Cape Town	
	2003-2004	Cape Town	
	1980-1996	Durban	
	20 October 1970 - 16 May 1997	Johannesburg	

== South Sudan ==
Flag	Date	Use	Description
	?-Present	Juba	

== Sudan ==
Flag	Date	Use	Description
	?-Present	Khartoum North	
	?-Present	Omdurman	

== Tanzania ==
Flag	Date	Use	Description
	?-Present	Arusha	
	?-Present	Dar es Salaam	
	?-Present	Kasulu	
	?-Present	Kibaha	
	?-Present	Makambako	
	?-Present	Mbeya	
	?-Present	Moshi	
	?-Present	Mwanza	
	?-Present	Tanga	

== Tunisia ==
Flag	Date	Use	Description
	?-Present	Sousse	
	?-Present	Tunis	

== Zambia ==
Flag	Date	Use	Description
	?-Present	Kitwe	

== Zimbabwe ==
Flag	Date	Use	Description
	?-Present	Bulawayo	
	18 April 1982 – Present	Harare	
	?-Present	Mutare	

=== Historical ===
Flag	Date	Use	Description
	?-1982	Fort Victoria	
	? - 18 April 1982	Salisbury	

== See also ==
- List of city flags in Asia
- List of city flags in Europe
- List of city flags in North America
- List of city flags in Oceania
- List of city flags in South America
