= Coporolo River =

River in Angola

- Location in Angola

Location
- Country: Angola

Physical characteristics
- Mouth
  - coordinates: 12°55′50″S 12°57′51″E

The Coporolo is an intermittent river in Angola. It flows through Dombe Grande in Benguela Province. It has sometimes been considered a permanent stream. Its mouth is at the Atlantic Ocean and the drainage area is 15,674 square kilometres (6,052 sq mi).

Seasonal flooding is a recurring problem with 6,700 people displaced in a flood in July 2011. Work to control seasonal flooding to protect the town and farms was to be done the following year.

== See also ==
- List of rivers of Angola
