= Lomaum Dam =

Dam in Angola

Coordinates: 12.72555°S 14.38576°E

- Interactive map of Lomaum Dam
- Country: Angola
- Construction began: 1965
- Demolition date: 1983

Power Station
- Annual generation: 20 MW

Lomaum Dam is a privately owned hydroelectric dam on the Catumbela River in the Benguela province of central Angola. Completed in 1965, it initially produced 20 megawatts (27,000 hp) of power, supplying electricity to the towns of Lobito, Benguela and Huambo. This dam was destroyed in 1983 by UNITA after Angola gained independence. This resulted in widespread flooding and the death of ten people. In 1987, Portugal provided credit for the rehabilitation of this structure. Plans for rehabilitation and enlargement to a capacity of 60 megawatts (80,000 hp) were made in 2008, with completion targeted for 2011.

== See also ==
- Energy in Angola
- UNITA
