= Gallery of city flags in Oceania =

This page lists the city flags in Oceania. It is a part of the Lists of city flags, which is split into continents due to its size.

== Australia ==
Adelaide (details)

Brisbane (details)

Canberra (details)

Darwin

Hobart

Launceston

Melbourne (details)

Perth (details)

Queanbeyan

Sydney (details)

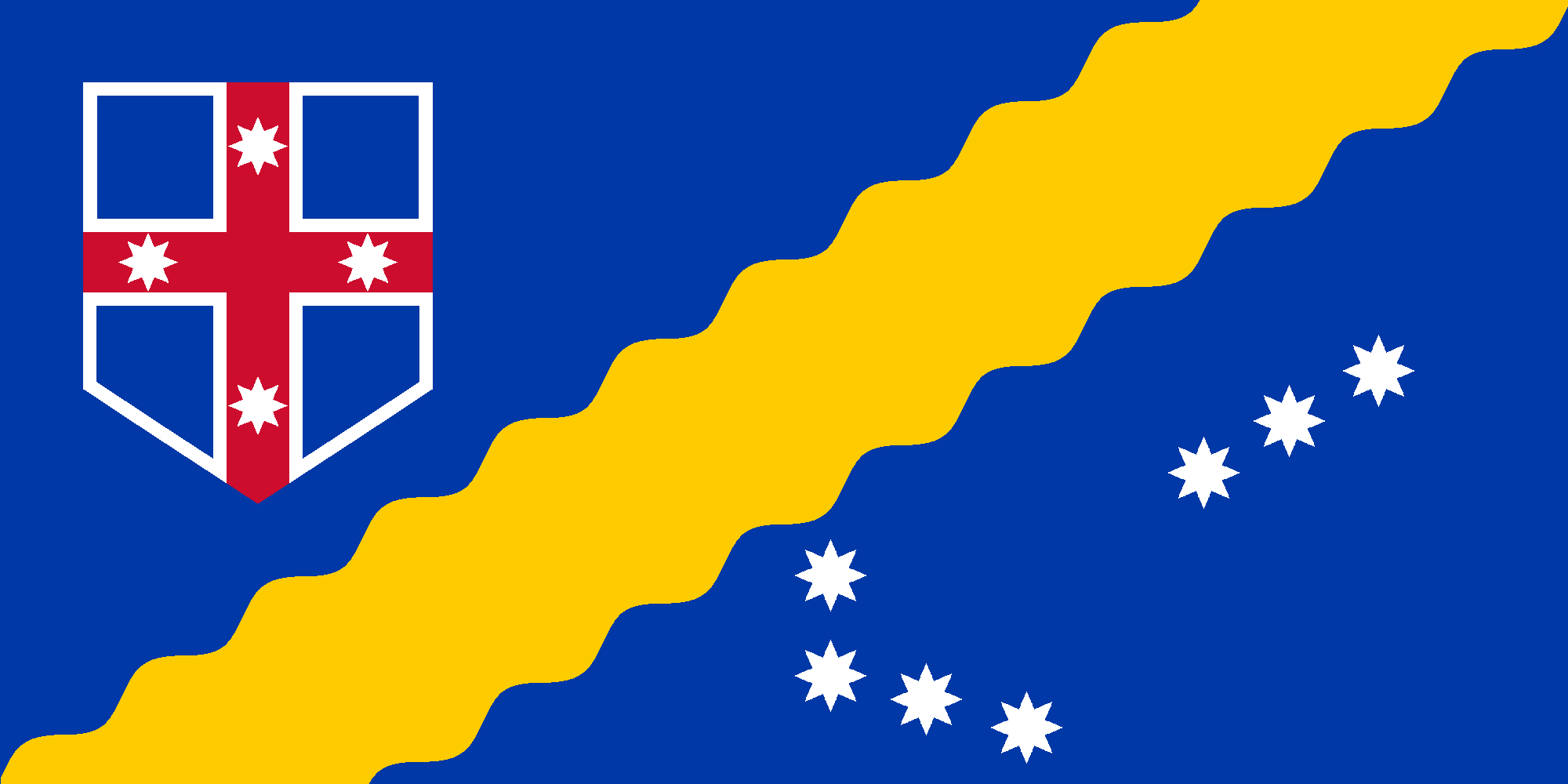
Wollongong

=== Historical ===
Canberra (until 1993)

== Fiji ==
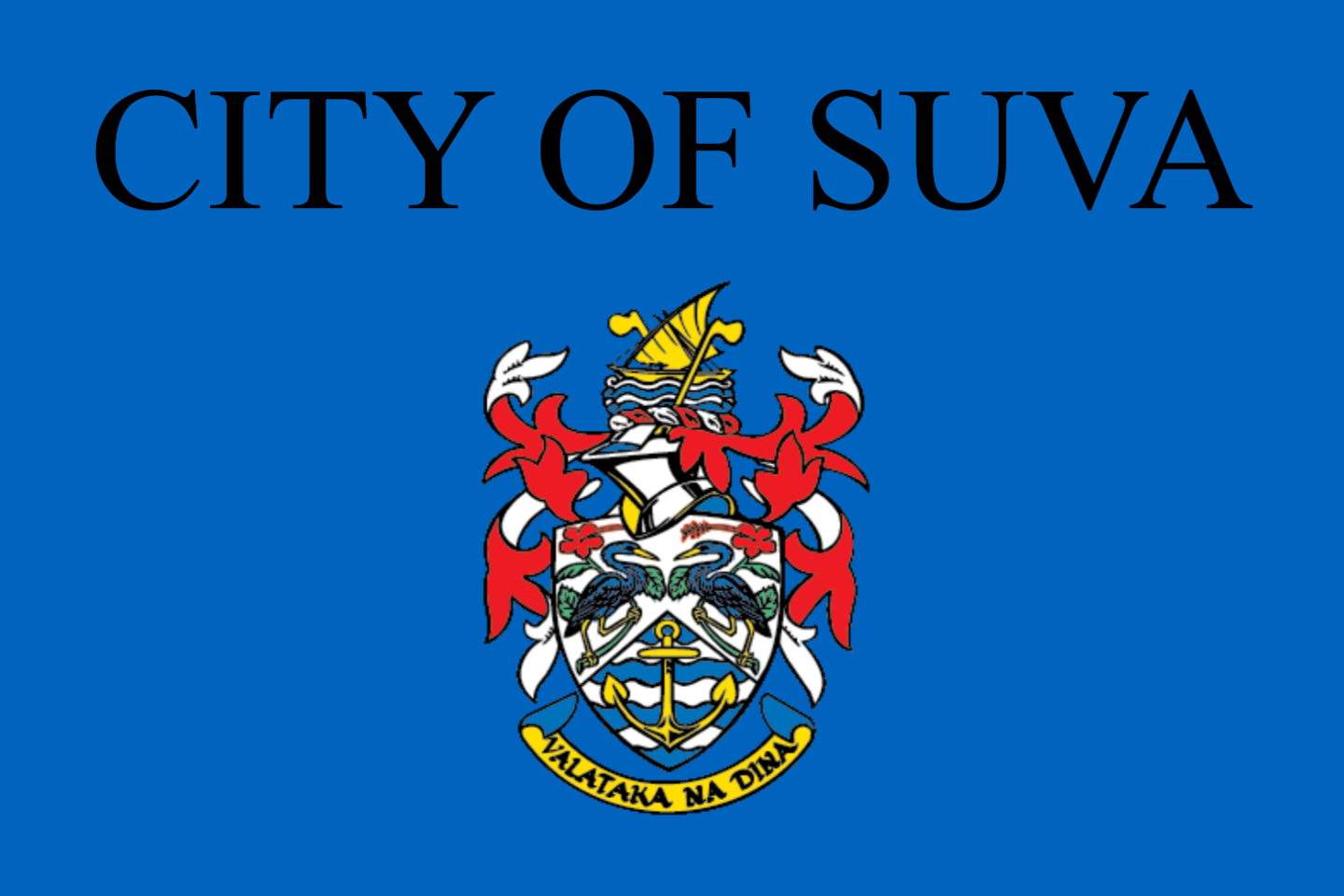
Suva

== French Polynesia ==
Bora-Bora

Fatu-Hiva

Gambier (details)

Hao

Hiva-Oa

Huahine

Maupiti

Moʻorea-Maiʻao

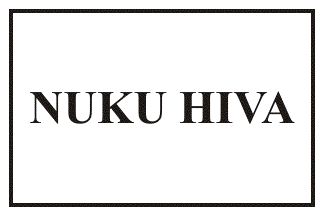
Nuku-Hiva

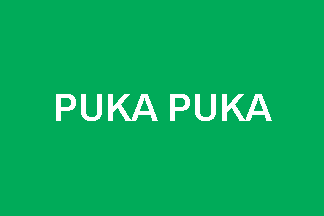
Puka-Puka

Raivavae

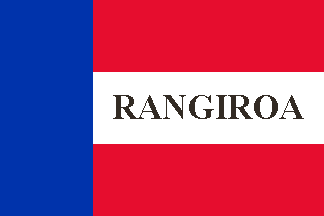
Rangiroa

Rapa Iti

Reao Pukaruha

Rimatara

Rūrutu

Tahuata

Tupuaʻi

== Guam ==
Hagåtña

== Hawaii ==
Honolulu (details)

== Marshall Islands ==
Ailuk Atoll

Arno Atoll

Bikini Atoll (details)

Ebon Atoll (unofficial)

Kwajalein Atoll

Majuro Atoll

Namdrik Atoll

Ujae Atoll

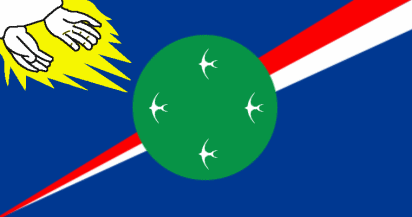
Utirik Atoll

Wotho Atoll

== Micronesia ==
Fefan

Kapingamarangi

Kitti

Kolonia

Kutu

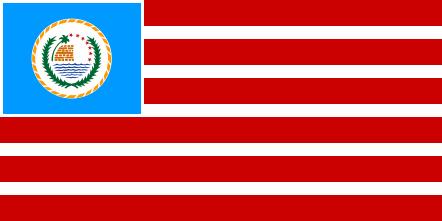
Madolenihmw

Moch

Mwoakilloa

Nett

Nukuoro

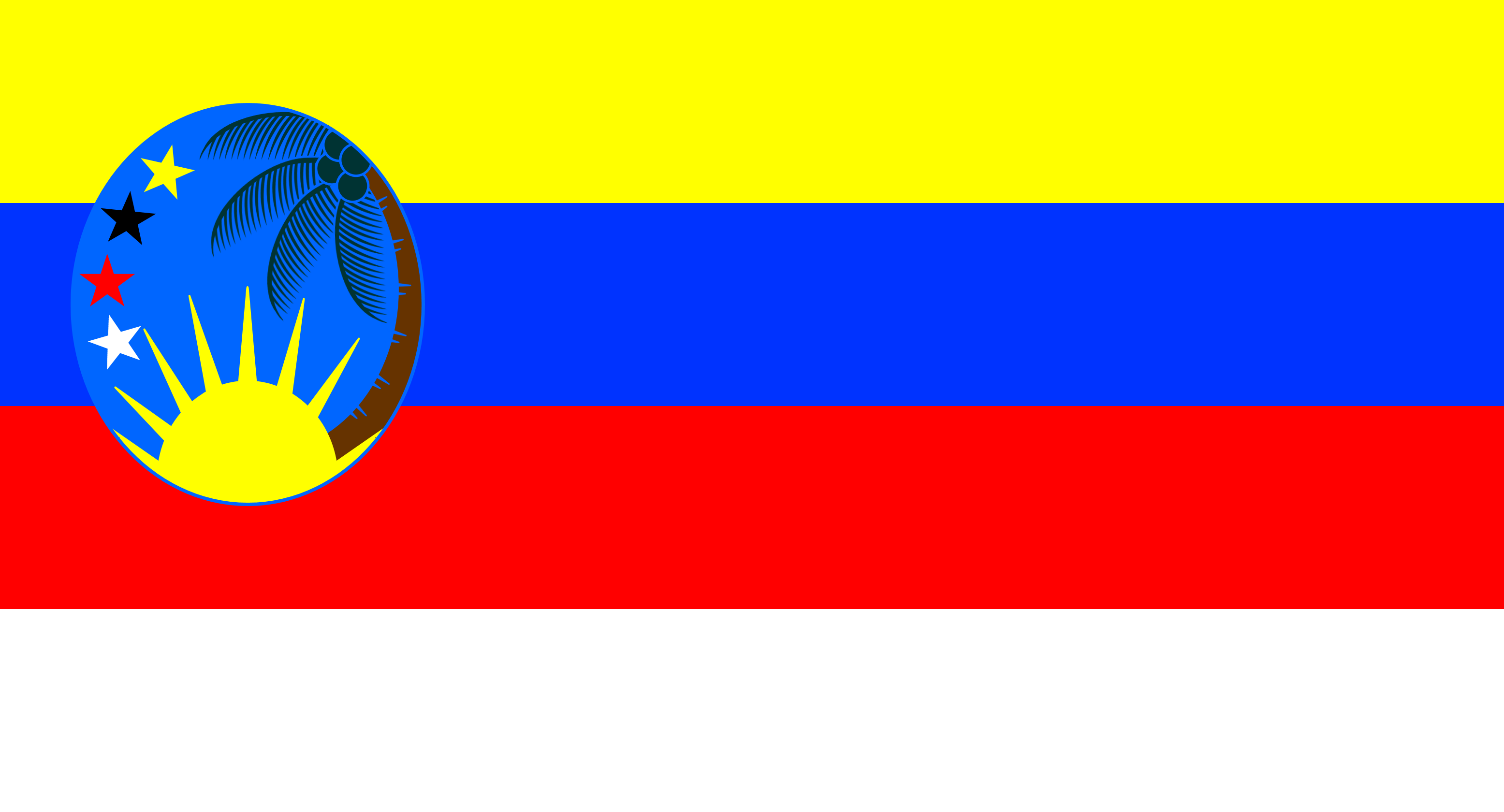
Pingelap

Pulusuk

Sapwuahfik

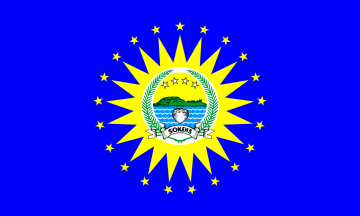
Sokehs

Tafunsak

Tonoas

Tsis

U

Udot

Utwe

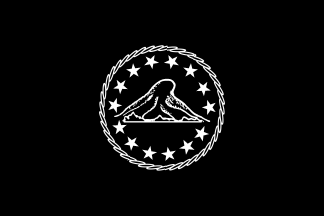
Weno

== New Caledonia ==
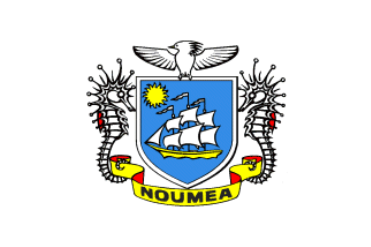
Nouméa

== New Zealand ==
Christchurch

Dunedin

Hamilton

Invercargill

Napier

Nelson (details)

Palmerston North

Porirua

Upper Hutt

Wellington (details)

Whanganui

=== Historical ===
Auckland City (until 2010) (details)

== Niue ==
Hakupu

== Palau ==
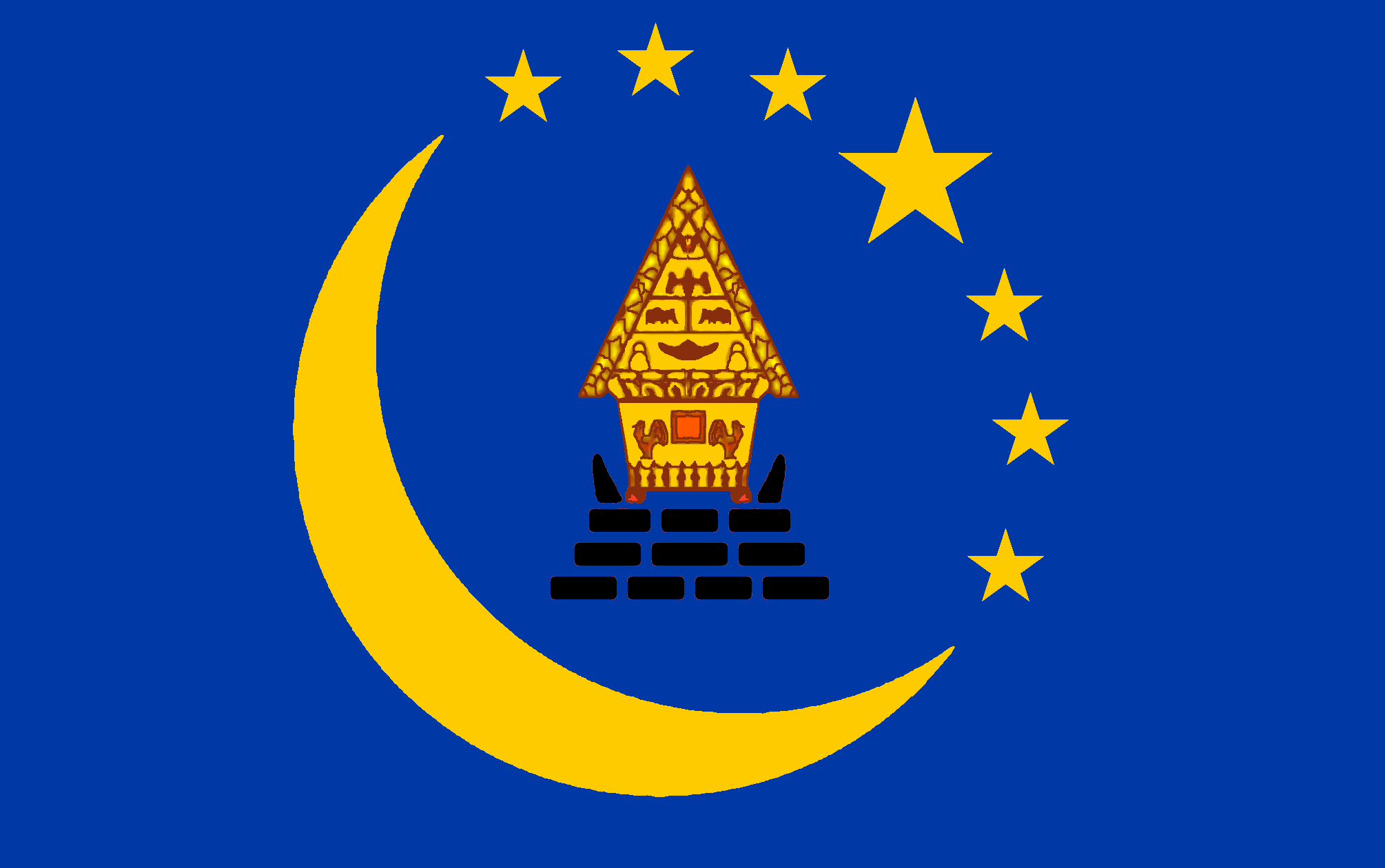
Koror (details)

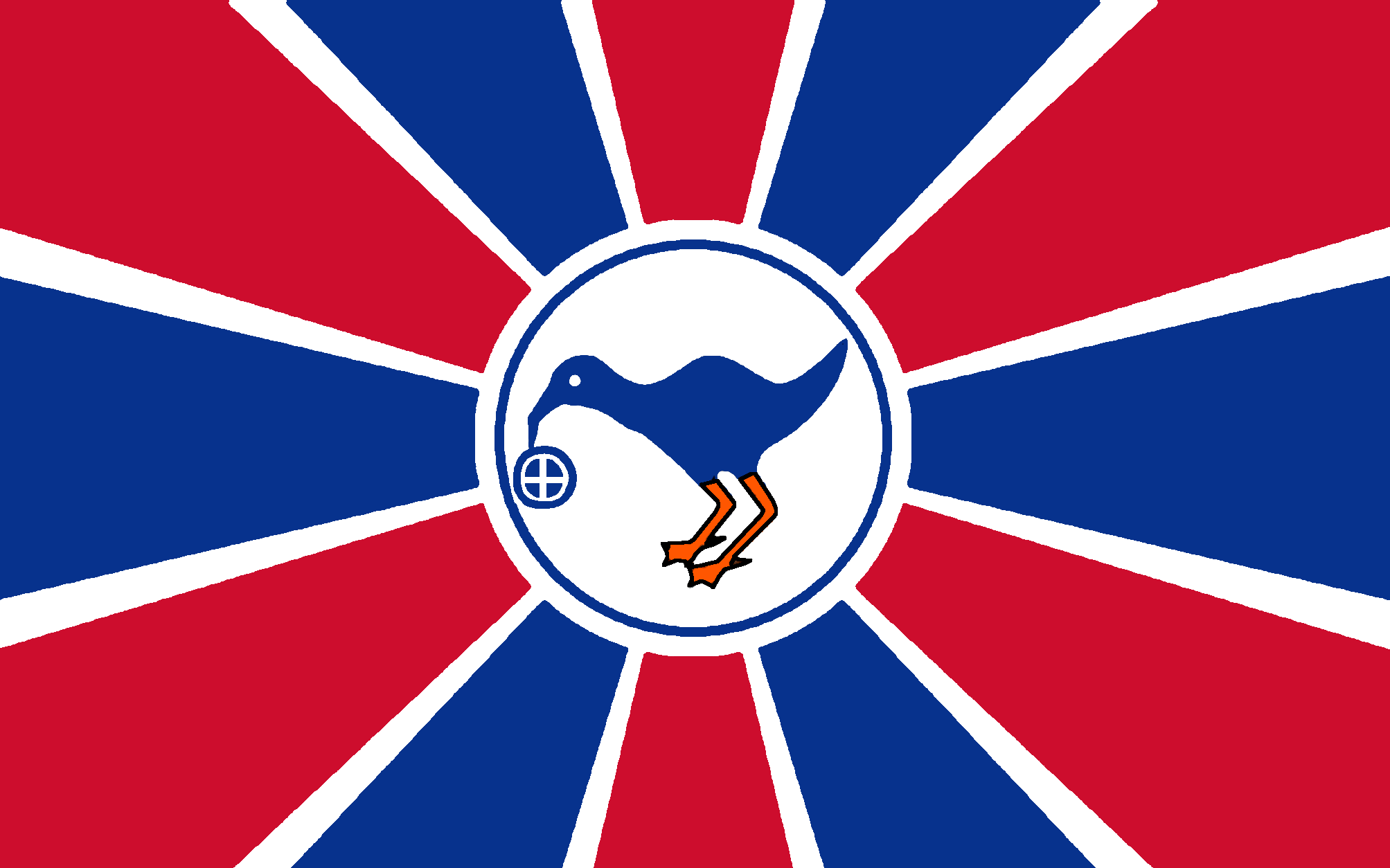
Melekeok

== Papua New Guinea ==
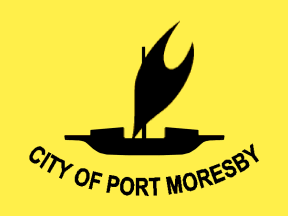
Port Moresby

== Solomon Islands ==
Honiara

== Tuvalu ==
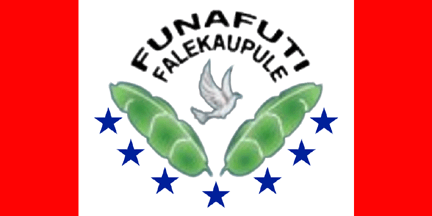
Funafuti

== Vanuatu ==
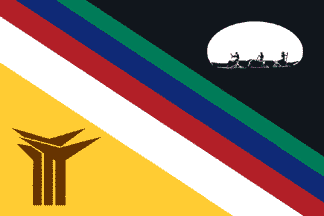
Luganville

Port Vila

=== Historical ===
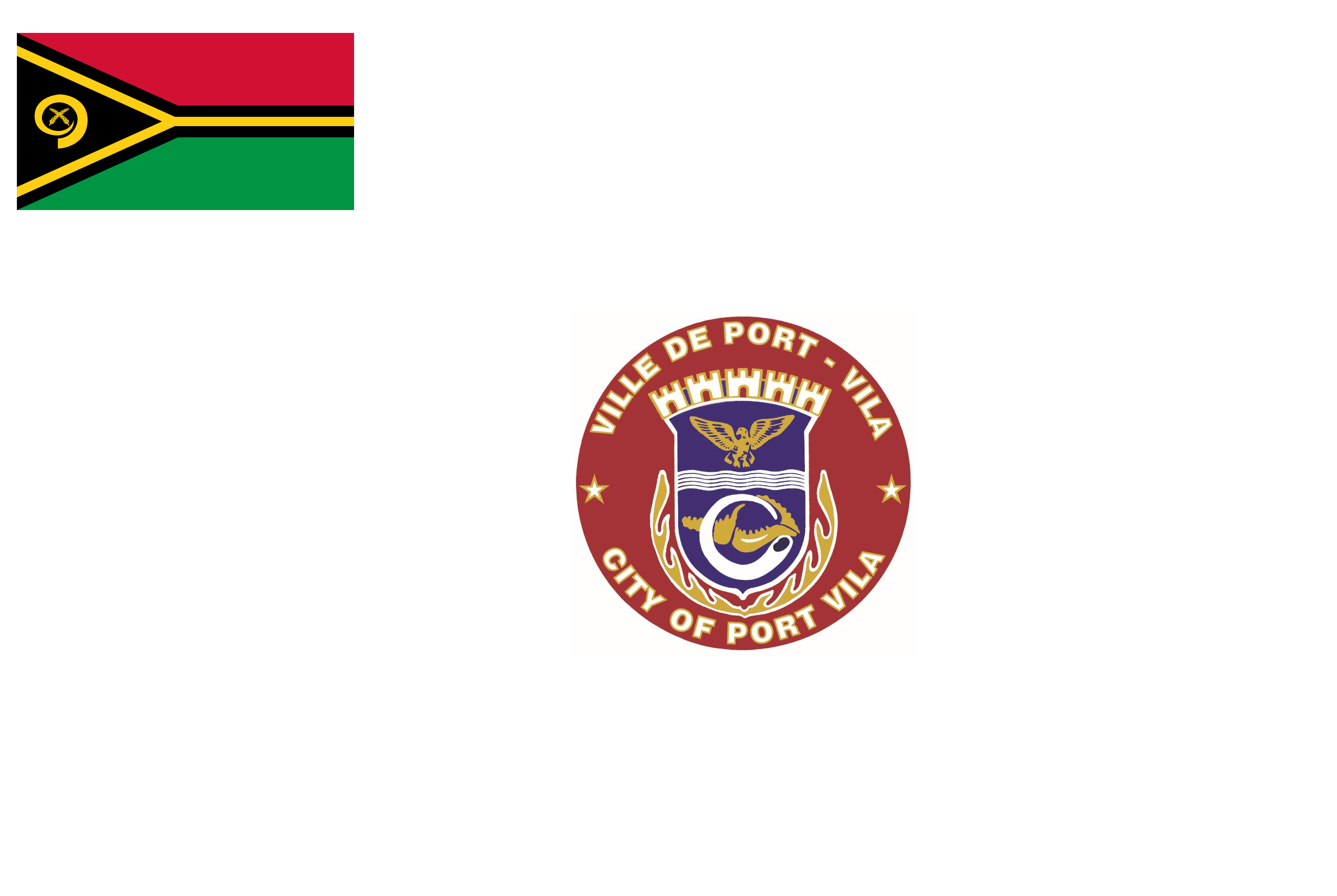
Port Vila (until 2020)

== See also ==
- List of city flags in Africa
- List of city flags in Asia
- List of city flags in Europe
- List of city flags in North America
- List of city flags in South America
