= Estêvão Binga =

Angolan Catholic prelate (born 1966)

The Most Reverend Estêvão Binga
- Bishop of Ganda, Angola
- Church: Catholic Church
- Archdiocese: Roman Catholic Archdiocese of Huambo
- See: Roman Catholic Diocese of Ganda
- Appointed: 1 August 2024
- Installed: 13 October 2024
- Predecessor: Diocese created
- Successor: Incumbent
- Other post: Auxiliary Bishop of Benguela (3 November 2021 - 1 August 2024)

Orders
- Ordination: 28 April 1996
- Consecration: 6 February 2022 by António Francisco Jaca
- Rank: Bishop

Personal details
- Born: Estêvão Binga; 2 September 1966 (age 59) Twei, Archdiocese of Lubango, Angola

Styles of Estêvão Binga
- Reference style: Your Lordship; The Most Reverend
- Spoken style: His Lordship
- Religious style: Bishop

Estêvão Binga (born 2 September 1966) is an Angolan Roman Catholic prelate who is the bishop of the Roman Catholic Diocese of Ganda in Angola since 1 August 2024. Before that, from 3 November 2021 until 1 August 2024, he was auxiliary bishop of the Roman Catholic Diocese of Benguela. Pope Francis appointed him bishop. He was consecrated at Benguela on 6 February 2022. He served as Titular Bishop of Nasbinca, while auxiliary bishop. On 1 August 2024, The Holy Father appointed him as the pioneer bishop of the Diocese of Ganda which The Pope erected that same day. He was installed at Ganda on 13 October 2024.

== Background and education ==
Estêvão Binga was born on 2 September 1966 at Twei, in Quilengues-Huila Municipality, in the Archdiocese of Lubango. This is located in the Huíla Province of Angola. He studied at the Minor Seminary of Cubal in Benguela. He then transferred to the Bom Pastor Preparatory and Philosophical Seminary in Benguela, where he studied philosophy. He studied Theology at the Creisto Rei Major Seminary in Huambo. He graduated with a Licentiate and a Doctorate in Dogmatic Theology from the Facultad de Teología del Norte de España (Faculty of Theology of Northern Spain) in Burgos, where he studied from 1997 until 2002.

== Priest ==
On 28 April 1996, he was ordained a priest for the Catholic Diocese of Benguela, Angola. He served as priest until 3 November 2021.

While a priest, he served in various roles and locations including:

- Prefect of Discipline and Professor at the Major Seminary of Benguela from 1996 until 1997.
- Studies in Spain leading to a Licentiate and a Doctorate in Dogmatic Theology at the Faculty of Theology of Northern Spain, in Burgos from 1997 until 2002.
- Prefect of Discipline at the Benguela Major Seminary from 2003 until 2005.
- Professor at the Benguela Major Seminary from 2003until 2022.
- Collaborator in the Parish of Our Lady of the Navigators in Benguela from 2004 until 2022.
- Rector of the Major Seminary of Benguela from 2005 until 2022.
- President of the Diocesan Commission for Study and Refresher Sessions from 2005 until 2022.
- Professor at various Institutions of Higher Education from 2010 until 2022.

== Bishop ==
On 3 November 2021, Pope Francis appointed the Reverend Father Monsignor Estêvão Binga as Titular Bishop of Nasbinca and Auxiliary Bishop of Benguela. He was consecrated bishop at Benguela on 6 February 2022 by António Francisco Jaca, Bishop of Benguela assisted by Giovanni Gaspari, Titular Archbishop of Alba Maritima and José Nambi, Bishop of Kwito-Bié.

On 1 August 2024, The Holy Father established the Roman Catholic Diocese of Ganda by splitting the Diocese of Benguela into two. The new diocese is a suffragan of the Metropolitan Ecclesiastical Province of Huambo. Bishop Estêvão Binga, previously auxiliary at Benguela was appointed as the first (pioneer) ordinary of the new diocese. He was installed at Ganda on 13 October 2024.

== See also ==
- Catholic Church in Angola

== Succession table ==
Preceded by Diocese created	Bishop of Ganda (since 1 August 2024)	Succeeded by Incumbent
Unknown	Auxiliary Bishop of Benguela (3 November 2021 - 1 August 2024)	Unknown
Unknown	Titular Bishop of Nasbinca (3 November 2021 - 1 August 2024)	Unknown
