= Bolongueira =

- commune
- Location in Angola
- Country: Angola
- Province: Benguela Province
- County: Chongoroi
- Time zone: UTC+1 (WAT)
- Climate: Aw

Bolongueira is an Angolan commune. It belongs to the municipality of Chongoroi, in the province of Benguela.
