= Cunene barb =

Conservation status
- Least Concern (IUCN 3.1)

Scientific classification
- Domain: Eukaryota
- Kingdom: Animalia
- Phylum: Chordata
- Class: Actinopterygii
- Order: Cypriniformes
- Family: Cyprinidae
- Subfamily: Smiliogastrinae
- Genus: Enteromius
- Species: E. dorsolineatus

Binomial name
- Enteromius dorsolineatus (Trewavas, 1936)

Synonyms
- Barbus dorsolineatus Trevawas, 1936

Species of fish

The Cunene barb or topstripe barb (Enteromius dorsolineatus) is a species of ray-finned fish in the genus Enteromius, it occurs only in Angola where it is found in the Catumbela, Balombo, and Kunene river systems.
