= Ebanga =

- commune
- Location in Angola
- Coordinates: 12°44′07″S 14°44′02″E
- Country: Angola
- Province: Benguela Province
- County: Ganda
- Time zone: UTC+1 (WAT)
- Climate: Aw

Ebanga is an Angolan commune. It belongs to the municipality of Ganda, in the province of Benguela.
