= Chigongo =

- commune
- Location in Angola
- Coordinates: 12°19′S 15°20′E
- Country: Angola
- Province: Benguela Province
- Time zone: UTC+1 (WAT)
- Climate: Aw

Chingongo is an Angolan commune . It belongs to the municipality of Balombo, in the province of Benguela .
