= Diocese of Viana =

There are two dioceses named Viana:

- Roman Catholic Diocese of Viana, Angola
- Roman Catholic Diocese of Viana, Brazil
