= Shorthead barb =

Conservation status
- Least Concern (IUCN 3.1)

Scientific classification
- Domain: Eukaryota
- Kingdom: Animalia
- Phylum: Chordata
- Class: Actinopterygii
- Order: Cypriniformes
- Family: Cyprinidae
- Subfamily: Smiliogastrinae
- Genus: Enteromius
- Species: E. breviceps

Binomial name
- Enteromius breviceps (Trewavas, 1936)

Synonyms
- Barbus breviceps Trewavas, 1936

Species of fish

The shorthead barb (Enteromius breviceps) is a species of ray-finned fish in the genus Enteromius from the catchments of the Longo and Cunene Rivers in Namibia and Angola.

== Footnotes ==
- Froese, Rainer; Pauly, Daniel (eds.). "Enteromius breviceps". FishBase.
