= Benguela (disambiguation) =

Benguela may refer to:

- Benguela, a city (the namesake capital of Benguela Province)
- Benguela (province)
- Benguela railway
- Benguela Current
- Benguela, a Capoeira rhythm
