= Imbala =

- commune
- Country: Angola
- Province: Benguela Province
- County: Cubal
- Time zone: UTC+1 (WAT)
- Climate: Aw

Imbala is an Angolan commune. It belongs to the municipality of Cubal, in the province of Benguela.
