= 4 de Abril Bridge =

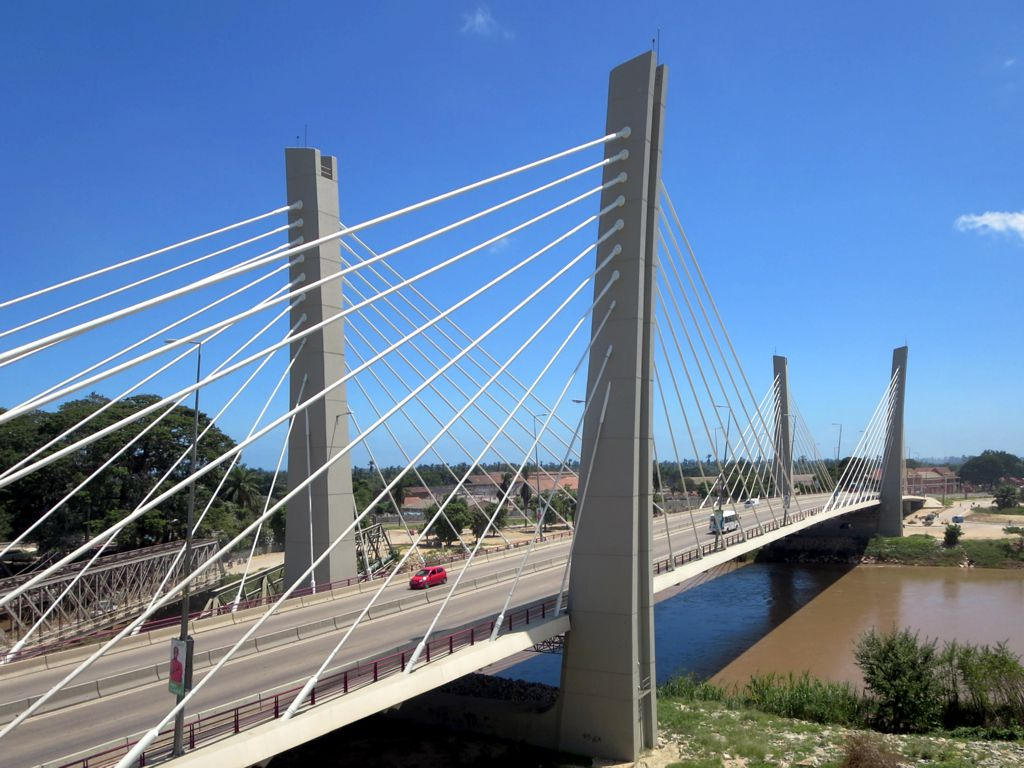
- Bridge over the Catumbela River
- Coordinates: 12°26′10″S 13°32′28″E

Characteristics
- Total length: 438 metres
- Width: 24.5 m

History
- Construction start: July 2007
- Construction end: July 2009
- Construction cost: 27 million
- Inaugurated: 10 September 2009

Catumbela Bridge (officially known as 4 de Abril Bridge) is a bridge over the Catumbela River, located in the municipality of Catumbela, Angola. The bridge, which was inaugurated on 10 September 2009, by the President of the Republic of Angola, José Eduardo dos Santos, connects the cities of Benguela and Lobito, in addition to other provinces of the country.

== Construction ==
The bridge construction began in July 2007 and was engineered for two companies, Soares da Costa and Mota-Engil by Armando Rite and Pedro Cabral. The work was completed in July 2009 at a cost of 27 million euros.

== Structure ==
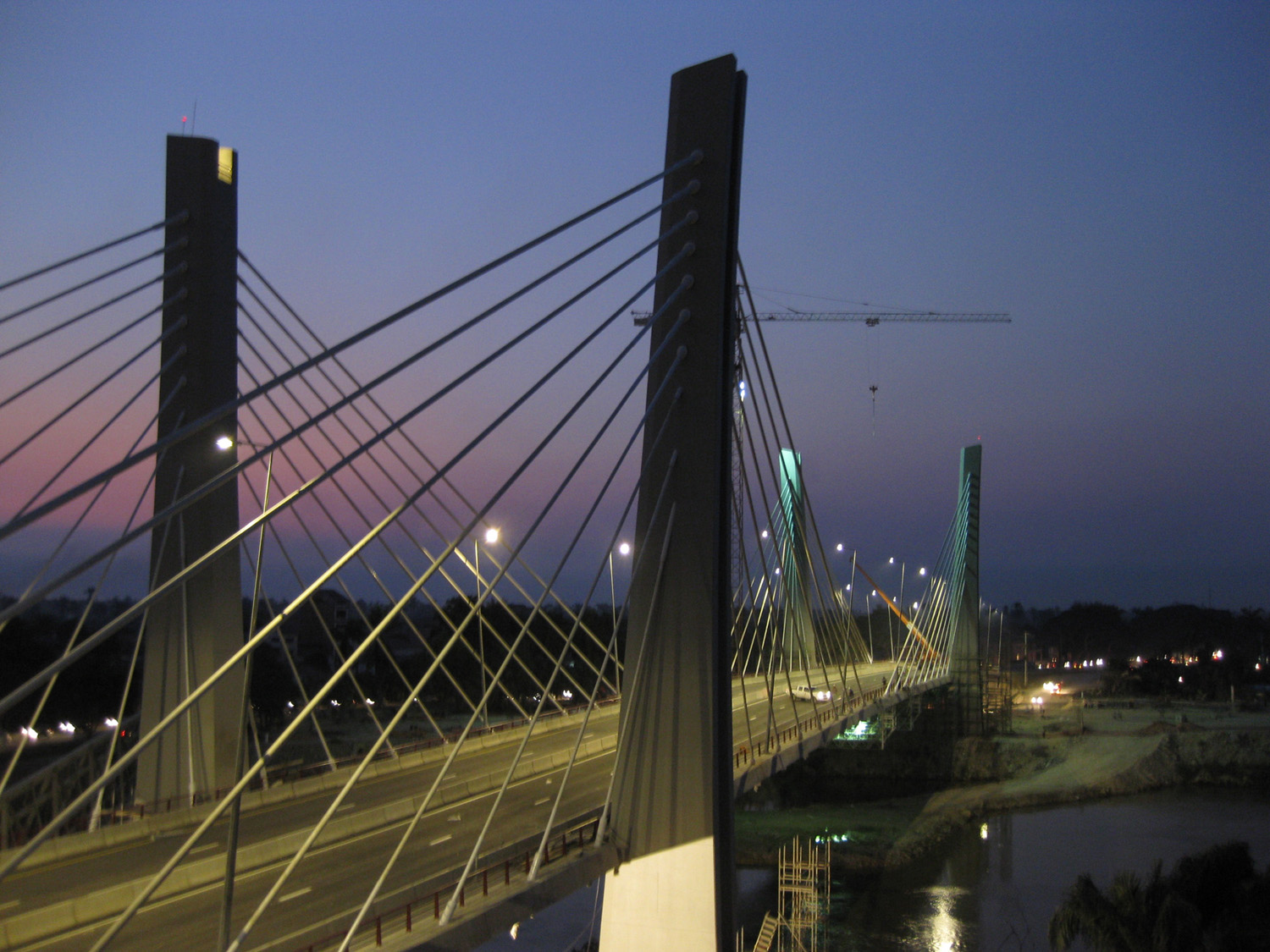
Night view of the bridge 4 de Abril

The Bridge is sanctuaries display by:

- Full suspension;
- A total length of 438 metres;
- Go Main 160 m;
- Lateral Spans 64 m each;
- Width of 24,5 m;
- Torres u-shaped, with 50 m each;
- Two Viaducts of access;
- Platform on the river with 170 metres;
- Two lanes in each direction;
- Two levels for the passage of pedestrians.

== Appointment ==
The name 4 April was assigned in allusion to the date of the peace agreements that occurred in 2002, which brought an end to the civil war in Angola.

Its construction is considered to be of great importance, because it allows the connection between the provinces of north, central and south of the country. Above all, the road allows for traffic between the cities of Benguela and Lobito.
