= Balombo =

- Municipality and town
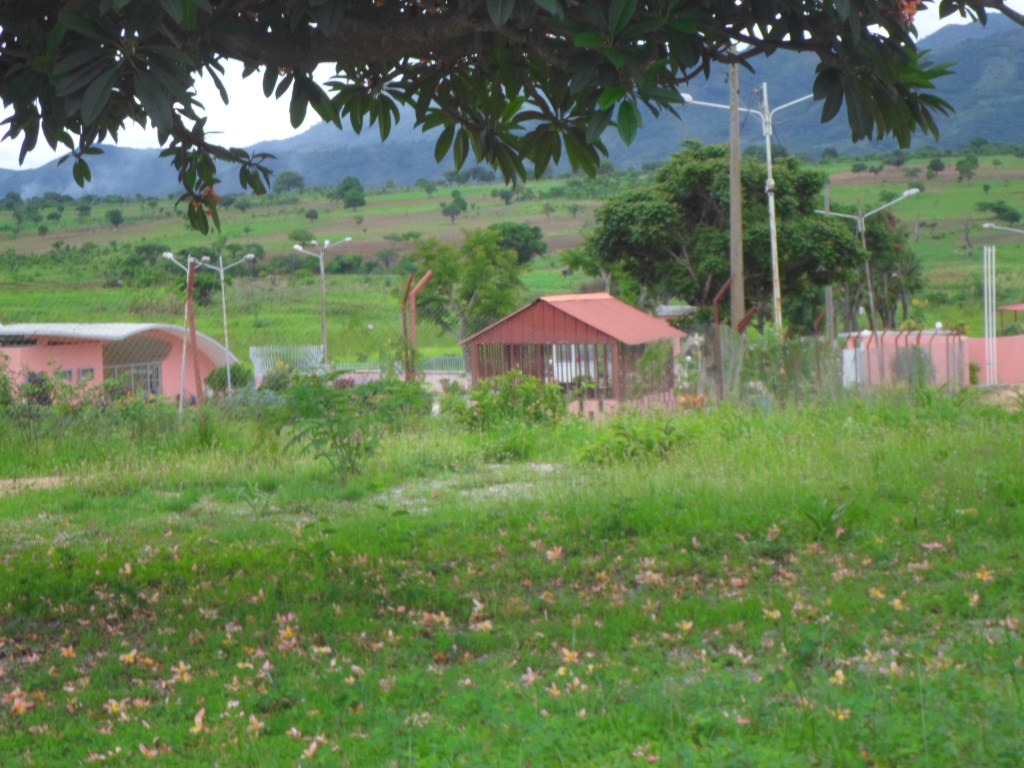
- Cutocota area, in Balombo municipality, 2015

- Location in Angola
- Coordinates: 12°21′S 14°46′E
- Country: Angola
- Province: Benguela Province

Population (2014 Census)
  - Municipality and town: 108,965
  - Urban: 36,361
- Time zone: UTC+1 (WAT)
- Climate: Aw

Balombo is a town and municipality in Benguela Province in Angola. The municipality had a population of 108,965 in 2014.

The municipality was created in 1954 and covers an area of 2,635 km². It is bordered to the north by the municipality of Cassongue, to the east by the municipality of Londuimbali, to the south by the municipalities of Ucuma, Chinjenje, and Ganda, and to the west by the municipality of Bocoio.

The municipality consists of the central commune, corresponding to the town of Balombo, and the communes of Chindumbo, Chingongo, and Maca Mombolo.

Its economic activity is based on agriculture.
