= Cubal do Lumbo =

- commune
- Location in Angola
- Coordinates: 12°19′S 15°20′E
- Country: Angola
- Province: Benguela Province
- County: Bocoio
- Time zone: UTC+1 (WAT)
- Climate: Aw

Cubal do Lumbo is an Angolan commune. It belongs to the municipality of Bocoio, in the province of Benguela.
