= Catumbela River =

River in central Angola

Coordinates: 12°27′S 13°29′E

Catumbela River Catumbella, Cata-Bella
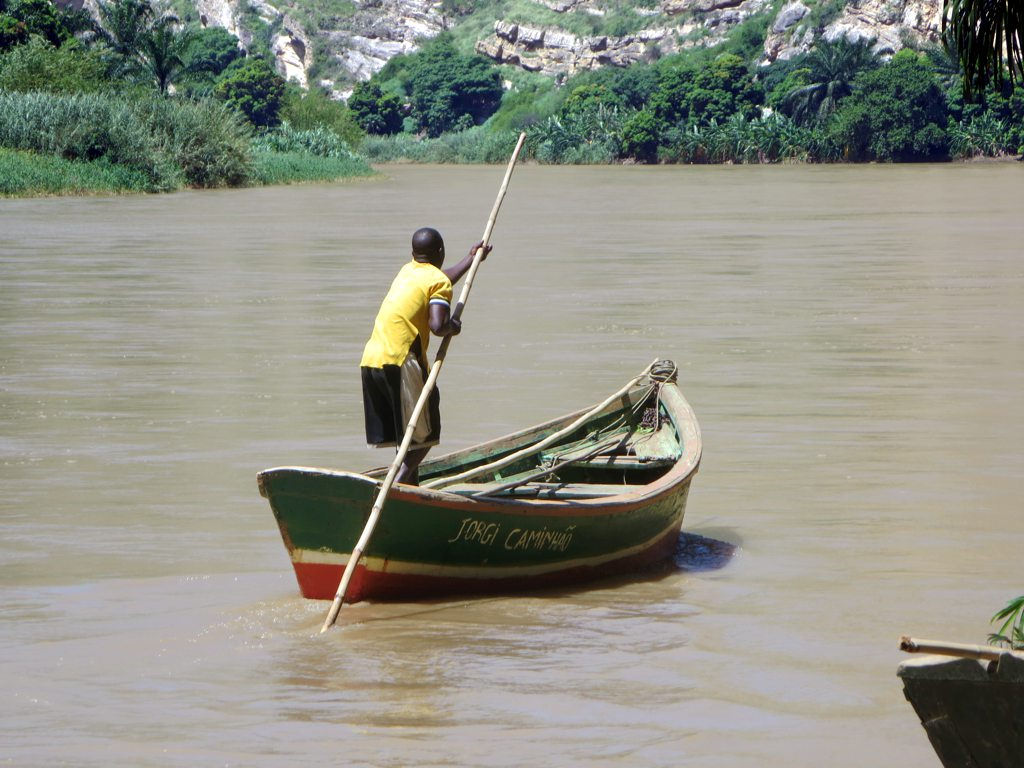
- Boatman navigating the waters of the Catumbela River in 2015.

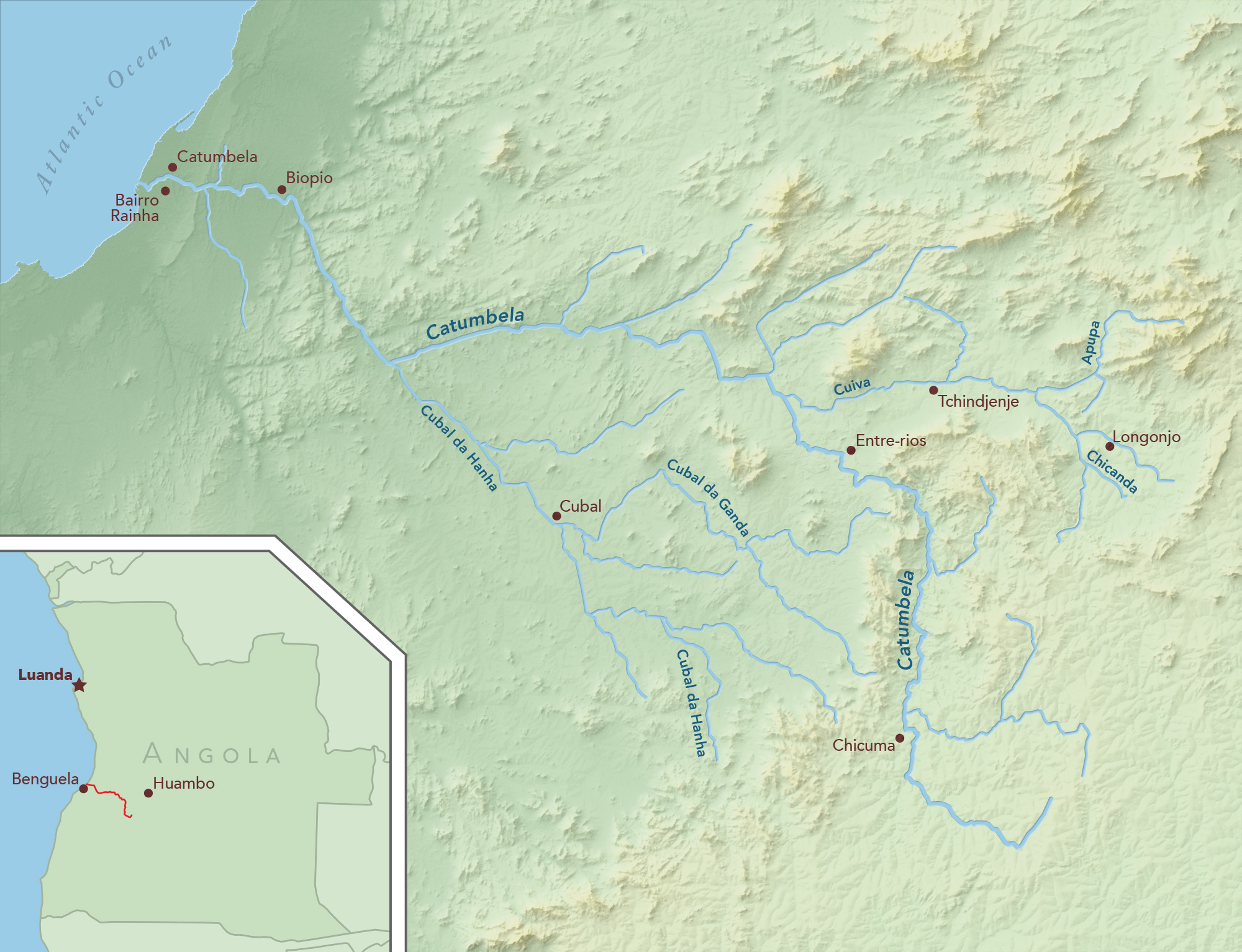
- Map of Catumbela River and tributaries.

Location
- Countries: Angola
- Provinces: Benguela Province
- Cities: Chikuma, Biópio, Catumbela

Physical characteristics
- Mouth: Catumbela Estuary
- Length: 240 km (150 mi)
- Basin size: 16,500 km^{2} (6,400 mi^{2})

Basin features
- Tributaries
  - left: Cubal
  - right: Cuíva

The Catumbela is a river in central Angola. The river mouth is at the Catumbela Estuary on the Atlantic Ocean at Catumbela, between Lobito and Benguela, and 240 kilometres (150 mi) from where it rises in the hills of Cassoco. The Catumbela supplies water to the city of Lobito. The mouth of the Catumbela was noted as a green vegetated region surrounded by barren land along the coast and a couple miles inland where it cuts a gorge through bare mountains. Alternate spellings are Catumbella and Cata-Bella.

Its main tributaries are the Cuíva River on the right bank, and Cubal River on the left bank.

The Catumbela was a center of the slave trade to the New World until it was banned in 1836. Portugal then built a fort at the river mouth and a small community grew up in the area. Exports of palm oil, rubber, serviçais (indentured servants), rum, sugar and other goods traded from further inland supported a small town with several hundred Portuguese colonists. The Cassaquel sugar company, founded in 1913, and later called Primeiro de Maio operated on the banks of the river and would become the largest sugar producer in Angola. It closed in 1990 but at its peak employed over 5,000 who lived in dozens of company towns.

Two dams on the Catumbela River produce electrical power for the Lobito and Benguela areas. The Lomaum Dam in Benguela province was built in 1965, destroyed by UNITA in 1983 and later rebuilt with Portuguese help.

The Benguela Railway built a bridge over the river in 1905. A new 438-metre-long (1,437 ft) bridge over the river on the Lobito to Benguela highway was completed in 2009.

== See also ==
- Energy in Angola
- List of rivers of Angola
