= Wamba River =

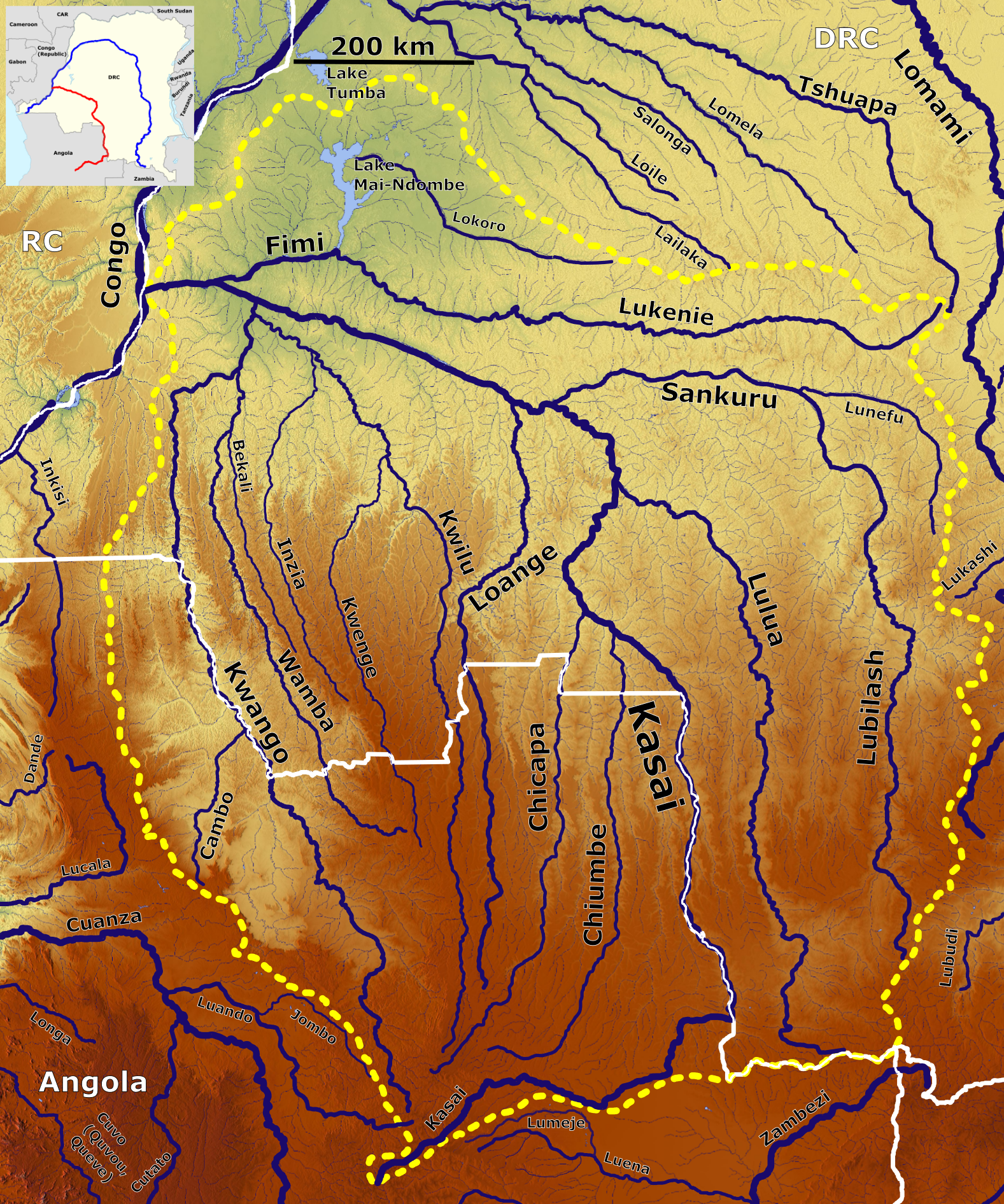
- The Kasai River basin with the Wamba River (Center left)

Location
- Countries: Democratic Republic of the Congo; Angola

Physical characteristics
- Source
  - location: Lunda Norte Province, Angola
  - elevation: 990 metres (3,250 ft)
- Mouth
  - location: Kwango Province, Democratic Republic of the Congo
  - elevation: 312 metres (1,023 ft)
- Length: 880 kilometres (550 mi)

The Wamba River (French: Rivière Wamba, Portuguese: Rio Wamba) is a river in the Democratic Republic of the Congo (DRC) and Angola. It arises at an elevation of around 990 metres (3,250 ft) as the confluence of several small streams in the Lunda Norte Province of Angola, a region of low hills and shallow ravines. In Angola it is known as the Uamba River.

It flows northward, where it forms a section of the Angola/DRC border, then for most of its length runs through the Kwango Province to its confluence into the Kwango River at an elevation of 312 metres (1,023 ft).

== Location ==
Point	Coordinates (links to map & photo sources)	Notes
Angola source	8.635°S 18.62083°E	
Angola/DRC border	8.0625°S 18.0945°E	
Kwango River confluence	3.9144°S 17.1889°E	

== See also ==
- List of rivers of the Democratic Republic of the Congo
- List of rivers of Angola
