= Egito =

- commune
- Location in Angola
- Coordinates: 11°57′43″S 13°45′51″E
- Country: Angola
- Province: Benguela Province
- Time zone: UTC+1 (WAT)
- Climate: Aw

Egito is a commune in Benguela Province in Angola.
