= Quiçama National Park =

National park in Angola

Kissama National Park
- IUCN category II (national park)
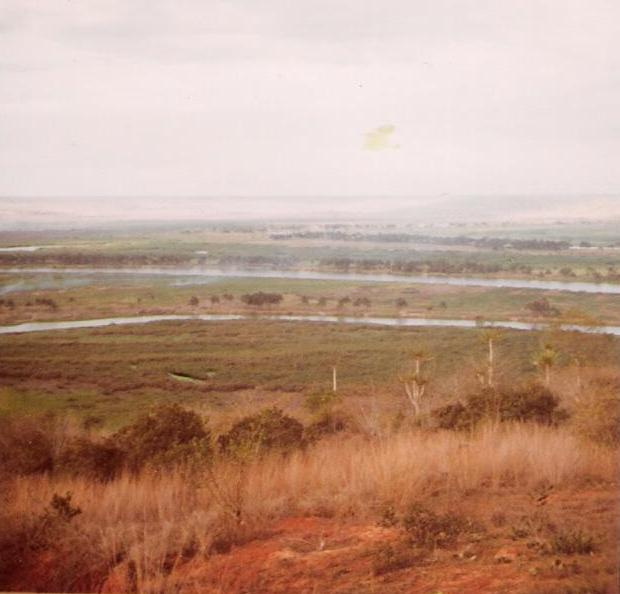

- Location within Angola
- Location: Northwestern Angola
- Nearest city: Luanda
- Coordinates: 9°45′S 13°35′E
- Area: 9,960 km^{2} (3,850 sq mi)
- Established: 1957

Quiçama National Park, also known as Kissama National Park (Portuguese: Parque Nacional do Quiçama or Parque Nacional da Quissama), is a national park in northwestern Angola.

It is the only functioning national park in all of Angola, with the others being in disrepair due to the Angolan Civil War.

The park is approximately 70 km from Luanda, the Angolan capital. The park covers 3 million acres (12,000 km²), more than twice the size of the U.S. state of Rhode Island.

The Portuguese name Quiçama is spelled in English and other languages as Kissama, Kisama or Quicama. The spelling Kissama in English is the closest to the Portuguese phonetic.

== Geography ==
The park is bordered on the west by 120 km of the Atlantic Ocean's coast. The Cuanza River forms the northern boundary, while the Longa River constitutes the southern border.

== History ==
What is now Quiçama National Park was formed as a game reserve in 1938. In January 1957, it was proclaimed a national park by the Portuguese administration of the Overseas Province of Angola.

The park once was home to an abundance of large game animals such as elephants and Giant Sable, but after wide-scale poaching during 25 years of civil war, the animal population was virtually eliminated.

In 2001, the Kissama Foundation, a group of Angolans and South Africans, initiated 'Operation Noah's Ark' to transport animals, especially elephants, from neighboring Botswana and South Africa. These animals, who were from overpopulated parks in their home countries, adapted well to the move. Noah's Ark was the largest animal transplant of its kind in history and has given the park momentum to be restored to its natural state.

Since 2005, the protected area and surroundings is considered a Lion Conservation Unit.

In 2025, the park was designated as a biosphere reserve by UNESCO.
