= Flag of Wellington =

City of Wellington
- Use: Civil flag
- Proportion: 2:3 (officially 6:9)
- Adopted: 12 December 1962
- Designed by: College of Arms

The city flag of Wellington, New Zealand contains a boat with a blue dolphin on its mast and three small English flags. This is on top of a blue circle which itself has a gold background and a black cross behind it. It was adopted on 12 December 1962.

== Description ==
The flag is officially described by the council as:

A black cross on a gold background, with the badge (a dolphin Naiant on a sail) in the centre. The colours are a yellow background, a black cross, and a blue badge and the proportions of the flag are 9 ft x 6 ft.

The badge depicted in the centre of the flag was granted to Wellington City Council by the College of Arms in 1963, with the heraldic description:

A Roundel Azure thereon a Lymphad Or the sail argent charged with a Dolphin naiant Azure pennon and flags flying Argent each charged with a Cross Gules.

== History ==
The idea of Wellington having its own flag was brought up by councillor John Gibbs Churchill in April 1957, which was later approved by the council on 15 May 1957. It was initially suggested that the flag should bear the coat of arms. A competition to find a flag design was held in the same year. The designs were considered to be too detailed, so the competition was scrapped. Another was held in 1958, where there was 44 flag entries. A design made by Dennis Beytagh, with two silver ferns, a shield, and the letter 'W' for Wellington won the competition and the creator was given £25 in prize money. The flag was later rejected, likely because the council received many letters detailing dislike for it. In the end, no decision could be made and the competition was scrapped.

The council then asked the College of Arms from London to design a flag for the city, which was approved on 12 December 1962. The flag was first ordered in 1963 for the royal visit.

== Reception ==
=== Criticism ===
The flag has been criticised by many, including the former deputy mayor, Jill Day and broadcaster Keith Quinn for symbolising colonialism by having a boat and three Saint George's Crosses. It has also been criticised for not representing Wellington, or having any Māori and cultural significance.

=== Support ===
The flag has been supported by many, including former mayor Celia Wade-Brown who, despite not flying it on the town hall during her mayoralty, stated that flying it "sounds like a fun thing to do".
