= Chila, Angola =

Chila
- commune
- Location in Angola
- Coordinates: 12°4′S 14°29′E
- Country: Angola
- Province: Benguela Province
- Time zone: UTC+1 (WAT)
- Climate: Aw

Chila is a commune in Benguela Province in Angola.
