= Bentiaba River =

River in Angola

- Location in Angola

Location
- Country: Angola

Physical characteristics
- Mouth
  - coordinates: 14°16′40″S 12°21′43″E

The Bentiaba (or Rio de São Nicolau or Saint Nicolas River) is a river in southern Angola. Its mouth is at the Atlantic Ocean near the commune of Bentiaba in Namibe Province.

The riverbank has produced a number of Cretaceous fossils including mosasaurs from Itombe Formation.

Bentiaba is also the name given to the Cretaceous bonebed.

== See also ==
- List of rivers of Angola
