= José Francisco Moreira dos Santos =

Portuguese Catholic bishop (1928–2023)

His Excellency José Francisco Moreira dos Santos OFM Cap
- Bishop Emeritus of Uíje
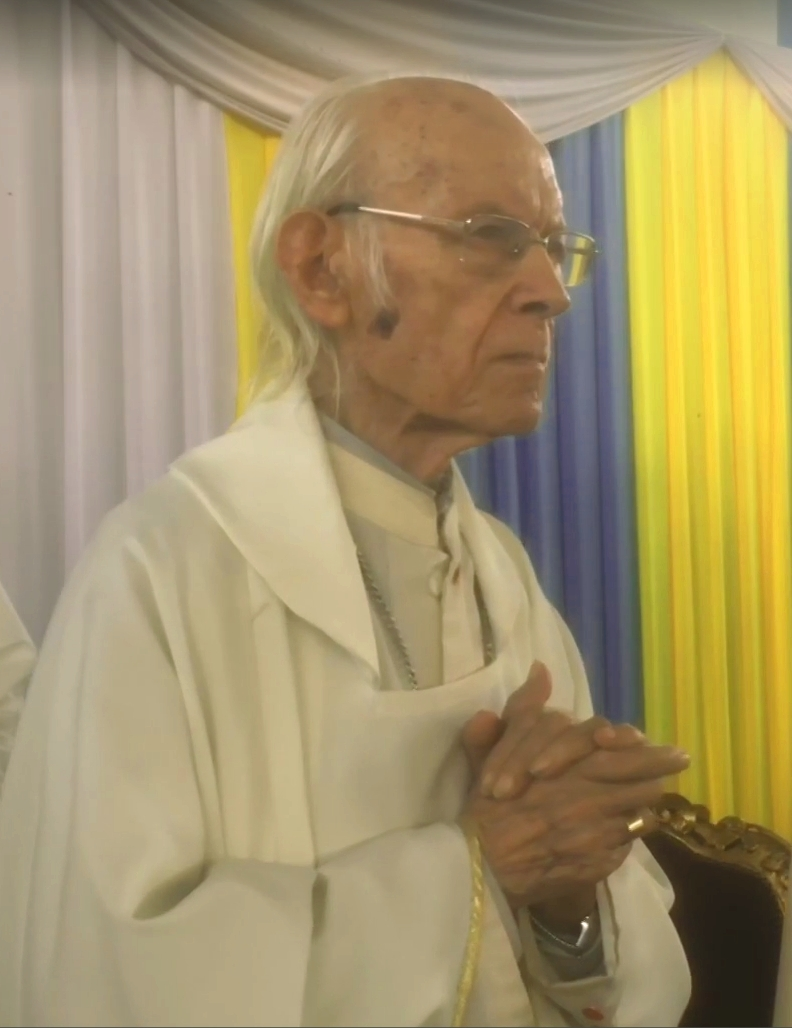
- Metropolis: Malanje
- Appointed: 14 March 1967
- Term ended: 2 February 2008
- Predecessor: Position established
- Successor: Emílio Sumbelelo

Orders
- Ordination: 20 January 1952
- Consecration: 30 April 1967 by Maximilien de Fürstenberg

Personal details
- Born: 12 October 1928 Mata Mourisca, Portugal
- Died: 16 March 2023 (aged 94) Luanda, Angola

José Francisco Moreira dos Santos OFM Cap (12 October 1928 – 16 March 2023) was a Portuguese Catholic bishop.

Ordained to the priesthood on 20 January 1952, Moreira dos Santos was named bishop of Diocese of Uíje, Angola in 1967 and retired on 2 February 2008.

Catholic Church titles
Preceded by Position established	Bishop of Uíje; 1967–2008	Succeeded by Emílio Sumbelelo
