= Diocese of Viana, Angola =

Roman Catholic diocese in Angola

Coordinates: 8.9098°S 13.3727°E

Diocese of Viana Dioecesis Viananensis

Location
- Country: Angola
- Metropolitan: Archdiocese of Luanda

Information
- Denomination: Catholic
- Rite: Roman
- Established: 2007
- Cathedral: Catedral Sé Catedral de São Francisco de Assis

Current leadership
- Pope: Leo XIV
- Bishop: Emílio Sumbelelo,
- Bishops emeritus: Joaquim Ferreira Lopes, OFMCap

The Roman Catholic Diocese of Viana (Latin: Dioecesis Viananensis) is a diocese located in the city of Viana in the ecclesiastical province of Luanda in Angola.

== History ==
- June 6, 2007: Established as Diocese of Viana from the Metropolitan Archdiocese of Luanda

== Leadership ==
- Bishops of Viana (Roman rite)
  - Bishop Joaquim Ferreira Lopes, OFMCap (June 6, 2007 - February 11, 2019)
  - Bishop Emílio Sumbelelo (February 11, 2019 - )

== See also ==
- Roman Catholicism in Angola

== Sources ==
- GCatholic.org
