= Dombe Grande =

- Commune and town
- Location in Angola
- Coordinates: 12.95°S 13.10°E
- Country: Angola
- Province: Benguela

Area
  - Total: 2,910 km^{2} (1,120 sq mi)

Population (2014)
  - Total: 41,434
  - Density: 14/km^{2} (36/sq mi)
- Time zone: UTC+1 (WAT)

Dombe Grande is a town, with a population of 25,000 (2014), and a commune in the province of Benguela, Angola.
