= Chicuma =

- commune
- Location in Angola
- Coordinates: 13°26′S 14°52′E
- Country: Angola
- Province: Benguela Province
- Time zone: UTC+1 (WAT)
- Climate: Aw

Chicuma is a commune in Benguela Province in Angola.
