= Nasbinca =

Roman Empire - Mauretania Caesariensis (125 AD).

Nasbinca was a Roman town of the Roman province of Mauretania Caesariensis. The location of Nasbinca is now lost to history but it was in today's Algeria. The town seems to have survived through late antiquity till at least the Muslim conquest of the Maghreb.

During the Vandal Kingdom and Roman Empire the town was the seat of a bishopric. In 484 the town's bishop Gennaro, attended the synod assembled in Carthage by the Vandal King Huneric, after which Gennaro was exiled to Sicily. The current titular bishop is Samuel Ferreira de Lima, of Rio de Janeiro.
