= Biópio =

- commune
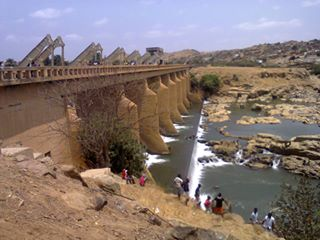
- Commune near river

- Location in Angola
- Coordinates: 12°28′S 15°45′E
- Country: Angola
- Province: Benguela Province
- Time zone: UTC+1 (WAT)
- Climate: Aw

Benfica is a commune in Benguela Province in Angola.
