= List of rivers of Angola =

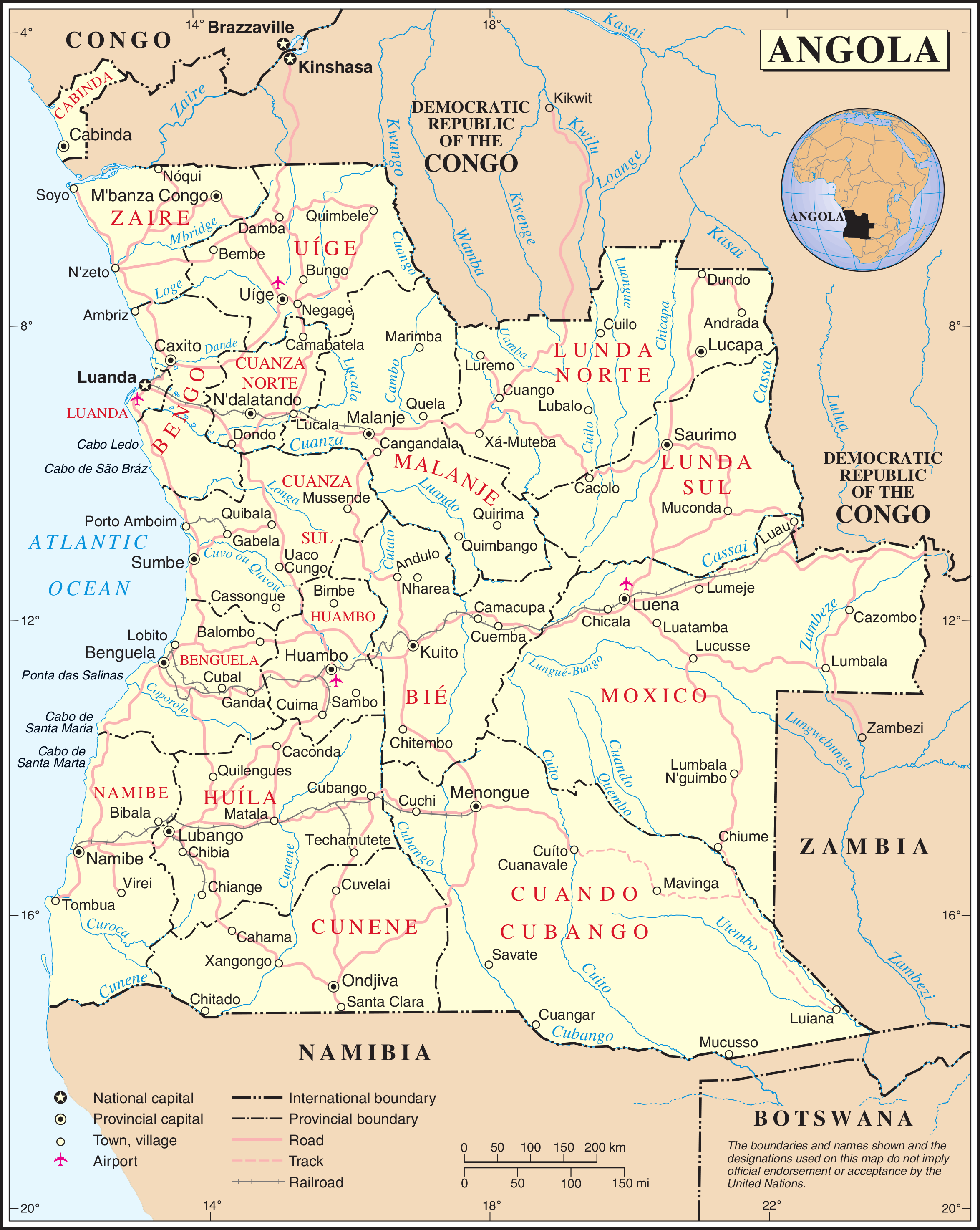
Map of Angola showing the main rivers and tributaries

This is a list of rivers in Angola. This list is arranged by drainage basin, with respective tributaries indented under each larger stream's name.

== Atlantic Ocean ==
- Chiloango River
- Congo River
  - Inkisi River
  - Kasai River (Cassai River)
    - Kwango River (Cuango River)
      - Kwilu River (Cuilo River)
        - Kwenge River
      - Wamba River (Uamba River)
      - Cuilo River
      - Cambo River
      - Lui River
    - Loange River
      - Lushiko River
    - Lovua River
    - Chicapa River
    - Luachimo River
    - Chiumbe River
      - Luia River
- Mbridge River
- Loge River
- Dande River
- Bengo River (Zenza River)
- Cuanza River
  - Lucala River
  - Luando River
  - Cutato River
  - Cunhinga River
- Longa River
- Cuvo River
- Quicombo River
- Catumbela River
  - Cuíva River
  - Cubal River
- Coporolo River
- Bentiaba River (Rio de São Nicolau)
- Bero River
- Curoca River
- Cunene River
  - Caculuvar River

== Indian Ocean ==
- Zambezi River
  - Cuando River
    - Luiana River
      - Utembo River
    - Quembo River
  - Luanginga River (Luio River)
  - Lungwebungu River (Lungué Bungo River)
  - Luena River

== Okavango Delta ==
- Okavango River (Cubango River)
  - Cuito River
