= Galleries of city flags =

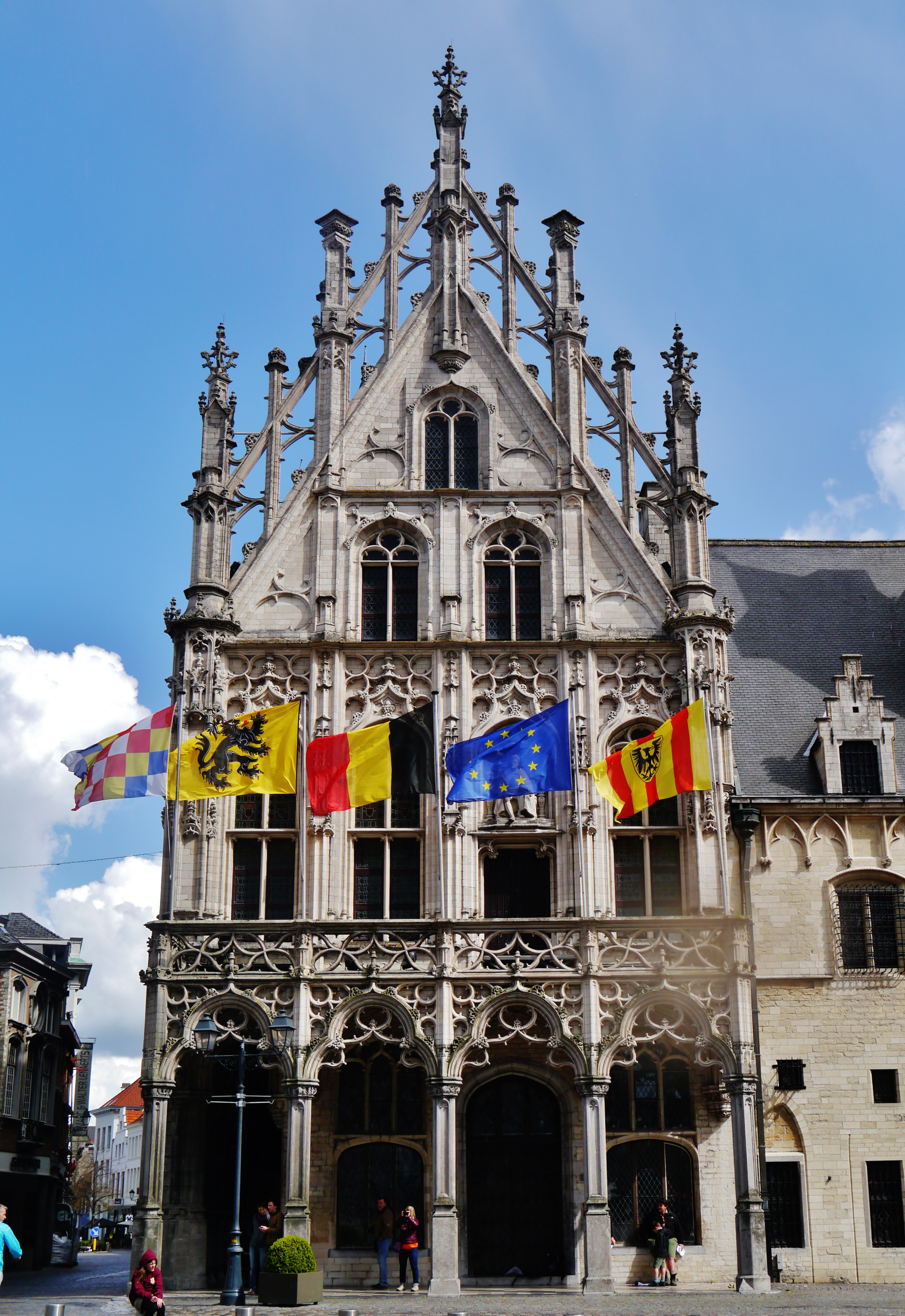
A city hall in Mechelen, Belgium uses these flags, including the city flag. (from left to right) Antwerp Province, Flanders, Belgium, European flag and Mechelen.

The list of city flags lists the flags of cities. Most of the city flags are based on the coat of arms or emblems of its city itself, and city flags can be also used by the coat of arms and emblems on its flag. Most of the city flags are flown outside town halls and councils.

Due to its size, the list is split into continents:

- List of city flags in Africa
- List of base flags in Antarctica
- Gallery of city flags in Asia
- Gallery of city flags in Europe
- Gallery of city flags in North America
- Gallery of city flags in Oceania
- Gallery of city flags in South America

== Flags of the largest cities ==
Cities with metropolitan area populations of five million; largest cities without their own city flag are not included.

Tokyo, Japan

Delhi, India

São Paulo, Brazil

Mexico City, Mexico

Osaka, Japan

New York City, United States

Buenos Aires, Argentina

Manila, Philippines

Rio de Janeiro, Brazil

Kinshasa, Democratic Republic of the Congo

Los Angeles, United States

Moscow, Russia

Paris, France

Bogotá, Colombia

Jakarta, Indonesia

Lima, Peru

Bangkok, Thailand

Seoul, South Korea

Nagoya, Japan

Tehran, Iran

Chicago, United States

Kuala Lumpur, Malaysia

Hong Kong

Santiago, Chile

Madrid, Spain

Houston, United States

Dallas, United States

Toronto, Canada

Miami, United States

Belo Horizonte, Brazil

Singapore

Philadelphia, United States

Atlanta, United States

Fukuoka, Japan

Barcelona, Spain

Johannesburg, South Africa

Saint Petersburg, Russia

Washington, D.C., United States

Yangon, Myanmar

Cairo, Egypt

Alexandria, Egypt

Guadalajara, Mexico

Sydney, Australia

Melbourne, Australia

== See also ==
- Flags of country subdivisions
- Gallery of flags of dependent territories
- Hanseatic flags
