= Flag of Honolulu =

City flag of Honolulu

The flag of Honolulu, Hawaii, consists of the city seal on a yellow field. The flag was adopted in 1960.

The flag contains symbolism coming from both inside and outside of the city. The shield depicted in the flag has been used since 1895 when a republic was established after the overthrow of the kingdom. The yellow color present in both the shield and the flag represent the island of O‘ahu (yellow being the color yellow ‘ilima).

- Pūloʻuloʻu: used to mark kapu for the commoners during the times of monarchy
- Red, blue and white stripes: from the state flag
- Rising sun: new era
- Star in the middle: Hawaii itself
