= Chindumbo =

- commune
- Location in Angola
- Coordinates: 12°00′S 18°2′E
- Country: Angola
- Province: Benguela Province
- Time zone: UTC+1 (WAT)
- Climate: Aw

Chindumbo is a commune in Benguela Province in Angola.
