= Cuvo River =

River in Angola

Cuvo
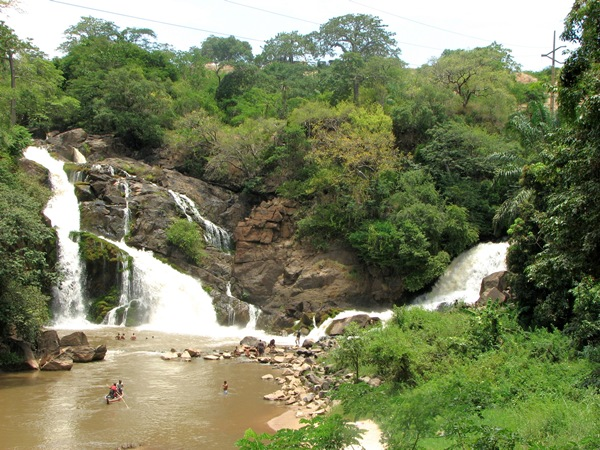
- Binda Falls

- Location in Angola

Location
- Country: Angola

Physical characteristics
- Mouth: Atlantic Ocean
  - coordinates: 10°51′44″S 13°47′50″E
- Length: 505 km (314 mi)
- Basin size: 22,908.3 km^{2} (8,844.9 mi^{2})
- Discharge
  - location: Near mouth
  - average: (Period: 1971–2000)369.1 m^{3}/s (13,030 cu ft/s)

The Cuvo is a river in central Angola. The river mouth is at the Atlantic Ocean at Benguela Bay, in Cuanza Sul Province. Cuvo is its name in its upper reaches; its lower course is called the Keve or Queve. The river is navigable upstream to Binga Falls near Gabela.

Its main tributaries include the Cussoi River.

The river may be the southern extent of the range of the African manatee. The river wetland floodplain and Kumbira Forest is part of an Important Bird Area with several rare species.

The river mouth has a mangrove stand.

== See also ==
- List of rivers of Angola
