= Bocoio =

- Municipality and town
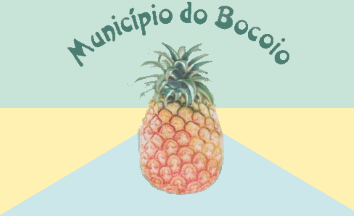
- Flag

- Location in Angola
- Coordinates: 12°27′S 14°09′E
- Country: Angola
- Province: Benguela Province

Area
  - Municipality and town: 2,145 sq mi (5,556 km^{2})

Population (2014 Census)
  - Municipality and town: 164,685
  - Density: 76.77/sq mi (29.64/km^{2})
  - Urban: 35,000
- Time zone: UTC+1 (WAT)
- Climate: Aw

Bocoio is a town and municipality in Benguela Province in Angola. Its administrative capital is Tchissandji. The municipality had a population of 164,685 in 2014.

It is located in the northeast side of the province, 106 km from the capital city, 75 km west of the railway city of Lobito and 75 km east of the municipality of Balombo.

The town used to be called Vila Sousa Lara during the colonial period having been established in 1827 by a Mr. Fernando, the first chefe do posto (town council chief) to be appointed.
