= Caimbambo =

- Municipality and town
- Location in Angola
- Coordinates: 12°54′S 14°5′E
- Country: Angola
- Province: Benguela Province

Area
  - Municipality and town: 3,229 km^{2} (1,247 sq mi)

Population (2014 Census)
  - Municipality and town: 90,838
  - Density: 28.13/km^{2} (72.86/sq mi)
  - Urban: 14,544
- Time zone: UTC+1 (WAT)
- Climate: Aw

Caimbambo is a town and municipality in Benguela Province in Angola. The municipality had a population of 90,838 in 2014.

The town was founded on September 1, 1921, and head as first council chief António Rodrigues.
