= Chongorói =

- Municipality and town
- Location in Angola
- Coordinates: 13°34′S 13°57′E
- Country: Angola
- Province: Benguela Province

Population (2014 Census Urban, 2022 figures Municipality)
  - Municipality and town: 107,533
  - Urban: 12,000
- Time zone: UTC+1 (WAT)
- Climate: Aw

Chongorói is a town and municipality in Benguela Province in Angola. The municipality had a population of 87,278 in 2014. And a population of 107,533 in 2022.
