= Longa River (Angola) =

River in Angola

- Location in Angola

Location
- Country: Angola

Physical characteristics
- Mouth
  - coordinates: 10°14′10″S 13°29′46″E

The Longa is a river in central Angola. The river forms the southern border of Kissama National Park and the border of Bengo Province and Cuanza Sul Province. Its mouth is protected by a long sand spit at the Atlantic Ocean. It has two major tributaries, Nhia and Mugige. The floodplain in the lower reaches of the river includes Lake Hengue and Lake Toto.

An eco-tourist fishing lodge is at the mouth of the river. A mercenary base was located on the Longa River during the Angola Civil War.

The Chiloglanis sardinhai (a catfish) is known only from the Longa and Caimbambo Rivers.

== See also ==
- List of rivers of Angola
