= Catumbela =

- Municipality and city
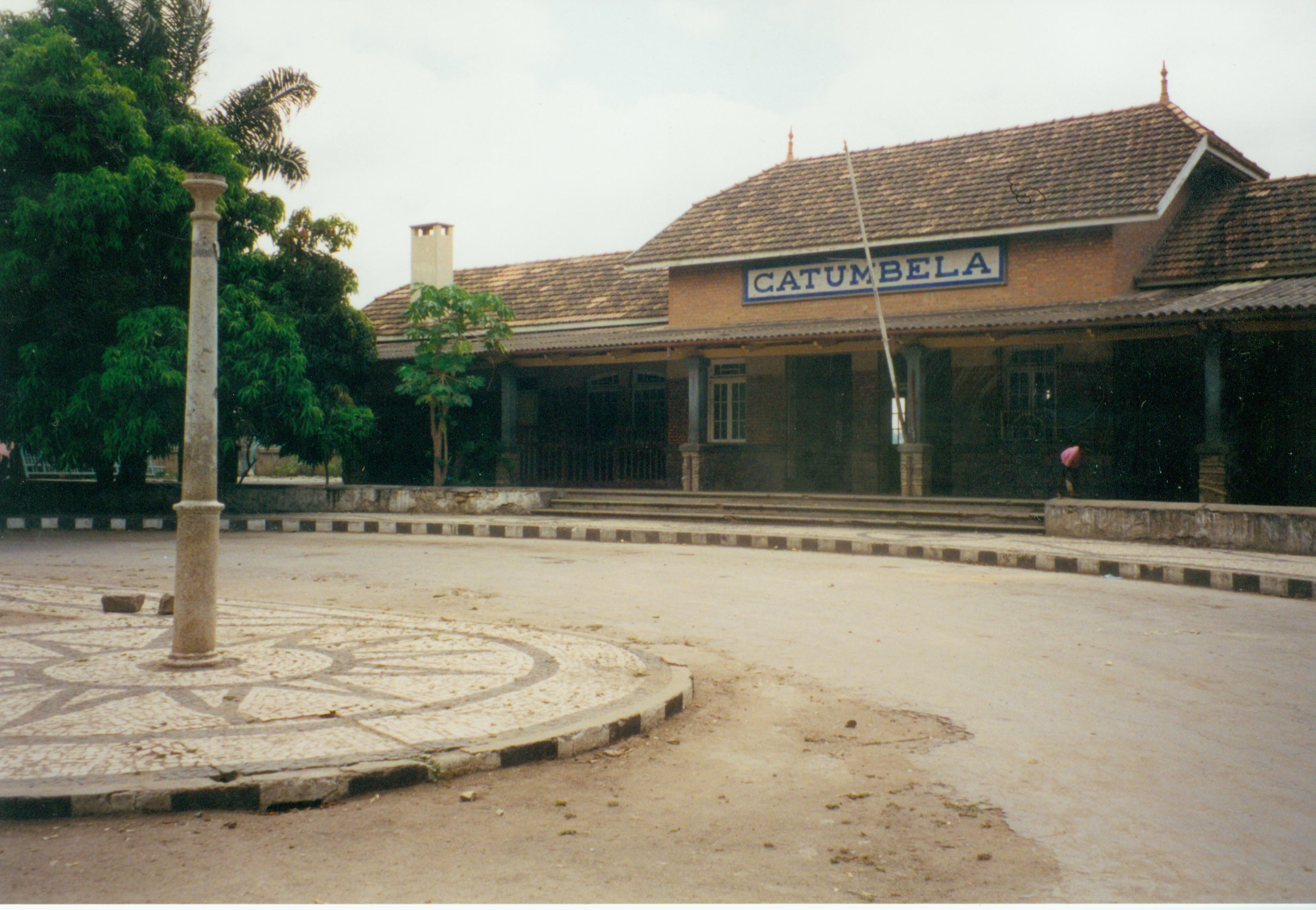
- Catumbela railway station

- Location in Angola
- Coordinates: 12°26′2.1″S 13°32′35.7″E
- Country: Angola
- Province: Benguela Province

Government
  - Mayor: Filomena Pascoal

Area
  - Municipality and city: 801 km^{2} (309 sq mi)

Population (2014 Census)
  - Municipality and city: 175,805
  - Density: 219/km^{2} (568/sq mi)
  - Urban: 95,034
- Time zone: UTC+1 (WAT)

Catumbela is a city and municipality of the Benguela province in Angola. The municipality had a population of 175,805 in 2014.

== History ==
In the late 18th and early 19th centuries, the Portuguese built Forte de São Pedro to establish themselves in Benguela. Today, the fort is in a dilapidated condition, but plans are being made to restore it and turn it into a museum.

Catumbela was a commune in the municipality of Lobito until 2011, when it became a municipality in its own right.

== Transport ==
Catumbela is served by a station on the national railway network as well as Catumbela Airport.

== See also ==
- Railway stations in Angola
