= Cubal =

Coordinates: 13°2′0″S 14°15′0″E

- Municipality and town
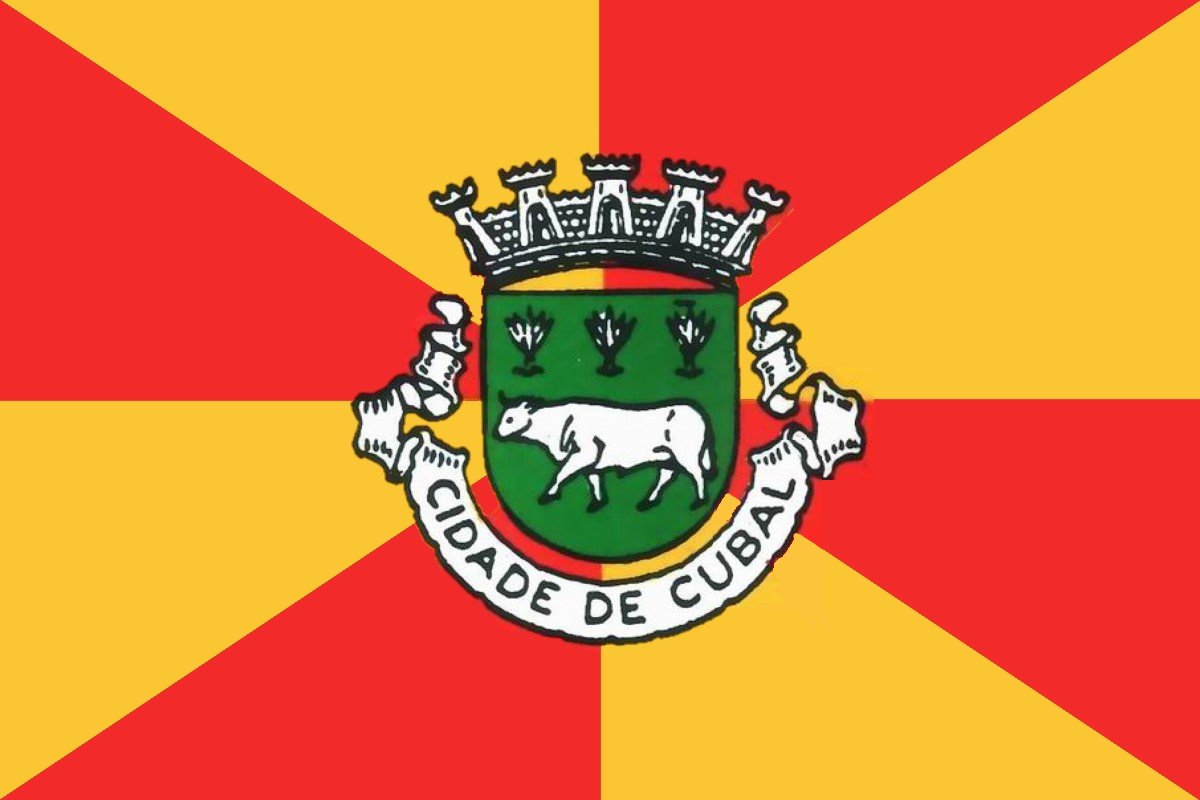
- Flag

- Location in Angola
- Country: Angola
- Province: Benguela Province

Area
  - Municipality and town: 561 sq mi (1,452 km^{2})

Population (2014 Census)
  - Municipality and town: 305,632
  - Urban: 90,367
- Time zone: UTC+1 (WAT)
- Climate: Aw

Cubal is a town and municipality in Benguela Province in Angola. The municipality had a population of 305,632 in 2014.

== Transport ==
It has a station on the central line of Angolan Railways.

== See also ==
- Railway stations in Angola
