= Benguela Province =

Province of Angola

Coordinates: 12°40′S 14°1′E

Benguela
- Province
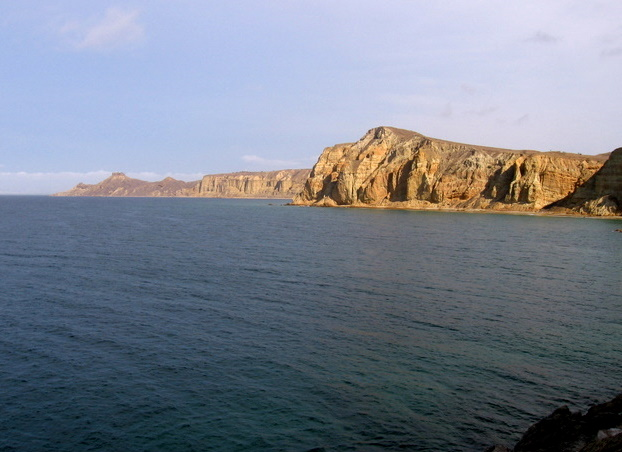

- Benguela, province of Angola
- Country: Angola
- Capital: Benguela

Government
  - Governor: Manuel Nunes Junior
  - Vice-Governor for the Political, Economic and Social Sector: Catia Francisca Gertrudes Tchimbinga Cachuco
  - Vice-Governor for Technical Services and Infrastructures: Adilson Dellany Martins Goncalves

Area
  - Total: 39,826 km^{2} (15,377 sq mi)

Population (2024 census)
  - Total: 2,597,638
  - Density: 65.225/km^{2} (168.93/sq mi)
- ISO 3166 code: AO-BGU
- HDI (2018): 0.523 low · 12th
- Website: www.benguela.gov.ao

Benguela (Umbundu: Luombaka Volupale) is a province of Angola, situated in the west of the country. It lies on the Atlantic Ocean, and borders the provinces of Cuanza Sul, Namibe, Huila, and Huambo. The province has an area of 39,826 square kilometres (15,377 sq mi) and its capital is Benguela. According to the 2014 census, there were 2,231,385 inhabitants in the province. The current governor of Benguela is Isaac dos Anjos.

== History ==
In the 16th-century there existed a Kingdom of Benguela. Its ruler first contacted agents of the Portuguese government in 1586 after Dias de Novais had defeated the forces of the ruler of Ndongo. A Portuguese attempt to contact the rulers of Benguela failed in 1587.

As of 1600 the ruler of Benguela was Hombi a Njimbe (sometimes Anglicized as Hombiangymbe). The kingdom at that time stretched from the headwaters of the Cuvo River to the Longa River, covering the northwestern highlands of what is today Angola. This area at the time was primarily Umbundu speaking.

The Portuguese crown created the Kingdom of Benguela in 1615 to improve the conditions to develop the desired land route to Mozambique across Africa. The trading post founded here did not meet the expectations of the Portuguese in mineral resources and soil quality, so a village was only established for the slave trade, under the name of Mbaka.

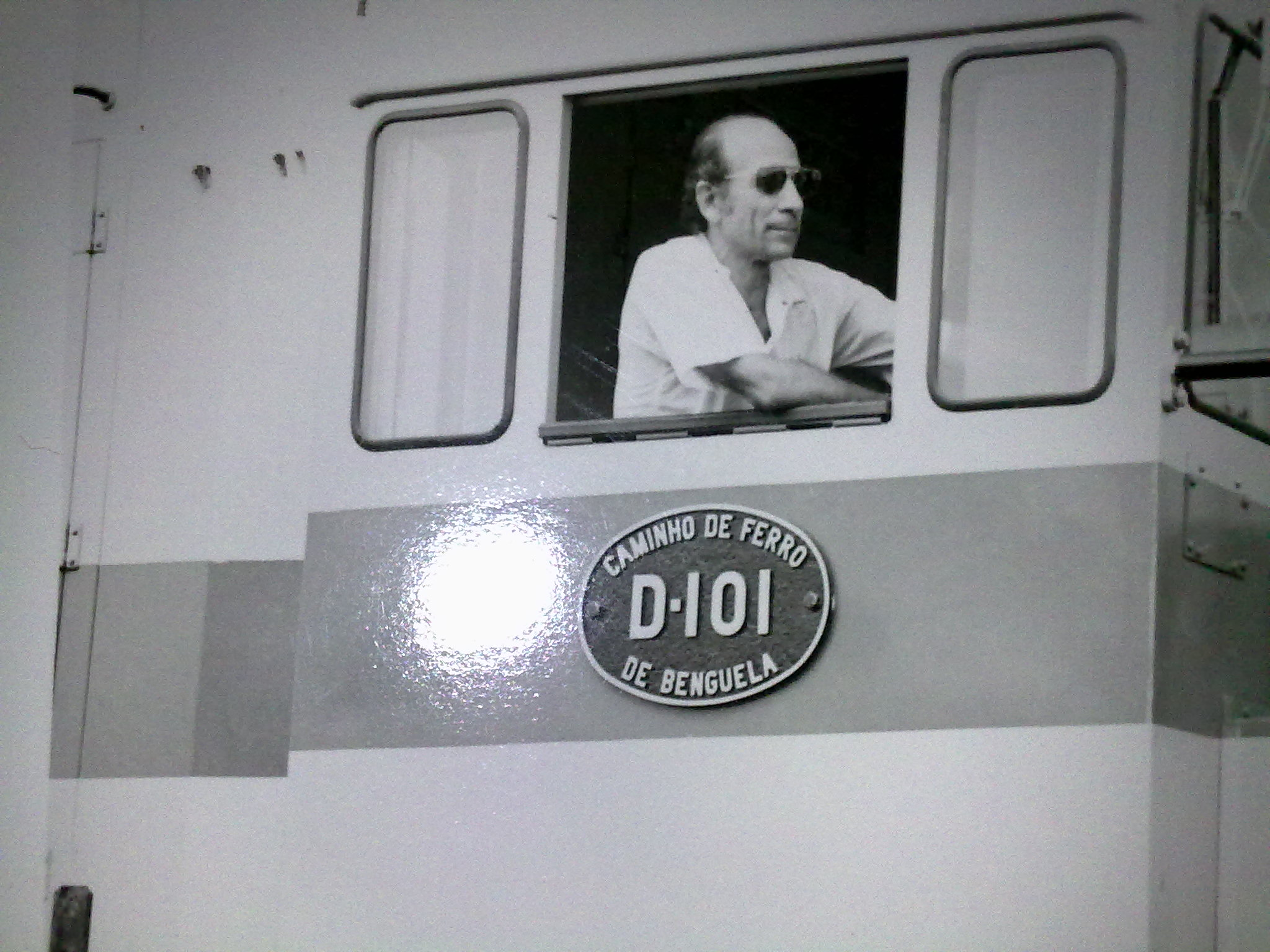
Caminho de Ferro de Benguela (1973)

With the era of imperialist efforts of European countries to acquire colonies in Africa, at the end of the 19th century, Portugal increased its presence in the region in order to protect them from the advances of the German Empire and other states. Even before the Berlin Congo Conference in 1884–85, when European powers divided up the African colonial territories among themselves, Portugal had strengthened its colonial administration as early as 1869, and divided the three districts of Luanda, Benguela and Moçâmedes (now Namibe). From 1903, the Benguela Railway was built connecting the port of Lobito to Belgian Congo, which led to the growing importance of the port and industries emerged, particularly the processing of sisal fiber, which contributed to the development of district of Benguela. By 1912, the Benguela Railway had reached Huambo from Lobito, and the line was eventually completed in 1929. Mostly after 1938, Benguela city's rubber and ivory trade made it a "relevant commercial warehouse".

Since the 1960s, with increased competition in the sisal trade worldwide, rich fish stocks off the coast have been one of the principal economic drivers of the region. From the late 1960s the population structure has changed, partly due to the regional economic upheaval, the massive emigration of European settlers from Angola when it became independent in 1975, and the influx of many IDPs during the Angolan Civil War (1975–2002); 1988 figures put the displaced population in the province at 21,478, living in nine camps.

== Geography ==
Benguela Province is situated in the west of the country, on the Atlantic coast. It also borders the provinces of Cuanza Sul (to the north), Namibe (to the southwest), Huila (to the southeast), and Huambo (to the east). It is traversed by the northwesterly line of equal latitude and longitude with three zones: coastal at 0–500 metres (0–1,640 ft); central at 500–1,200 metres (1,600–3,900 ft); and eastern with a medium altitude greater than 1,500 metres (4,900 ft).

== Municipalities ==
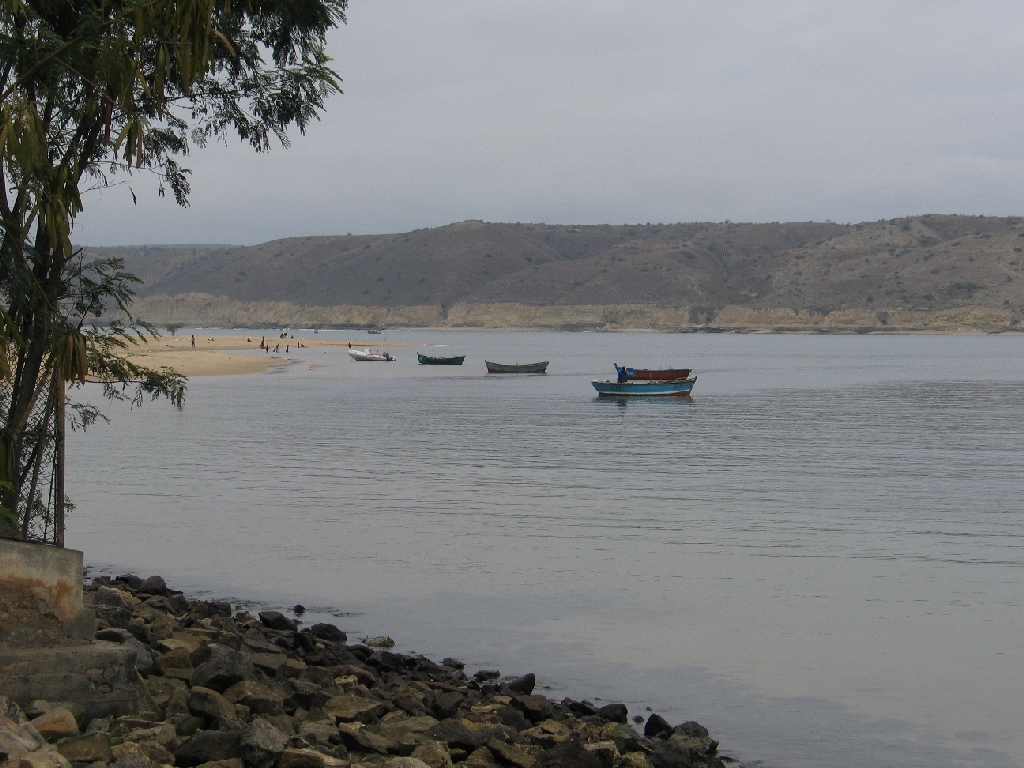
Fishing boats near Lobito

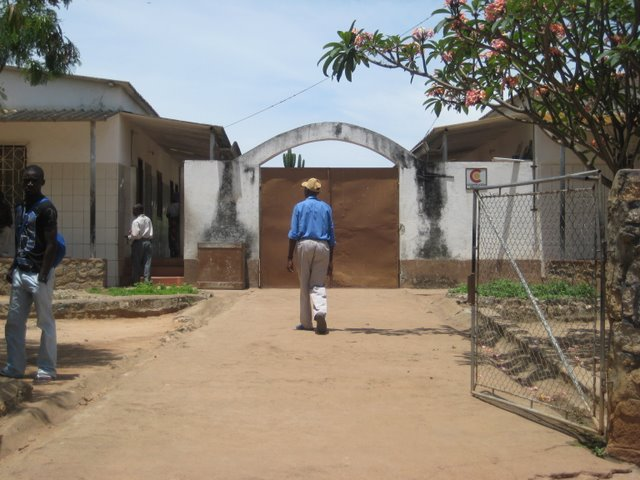
Hospital Nossa Senhora da Paz in Cubal

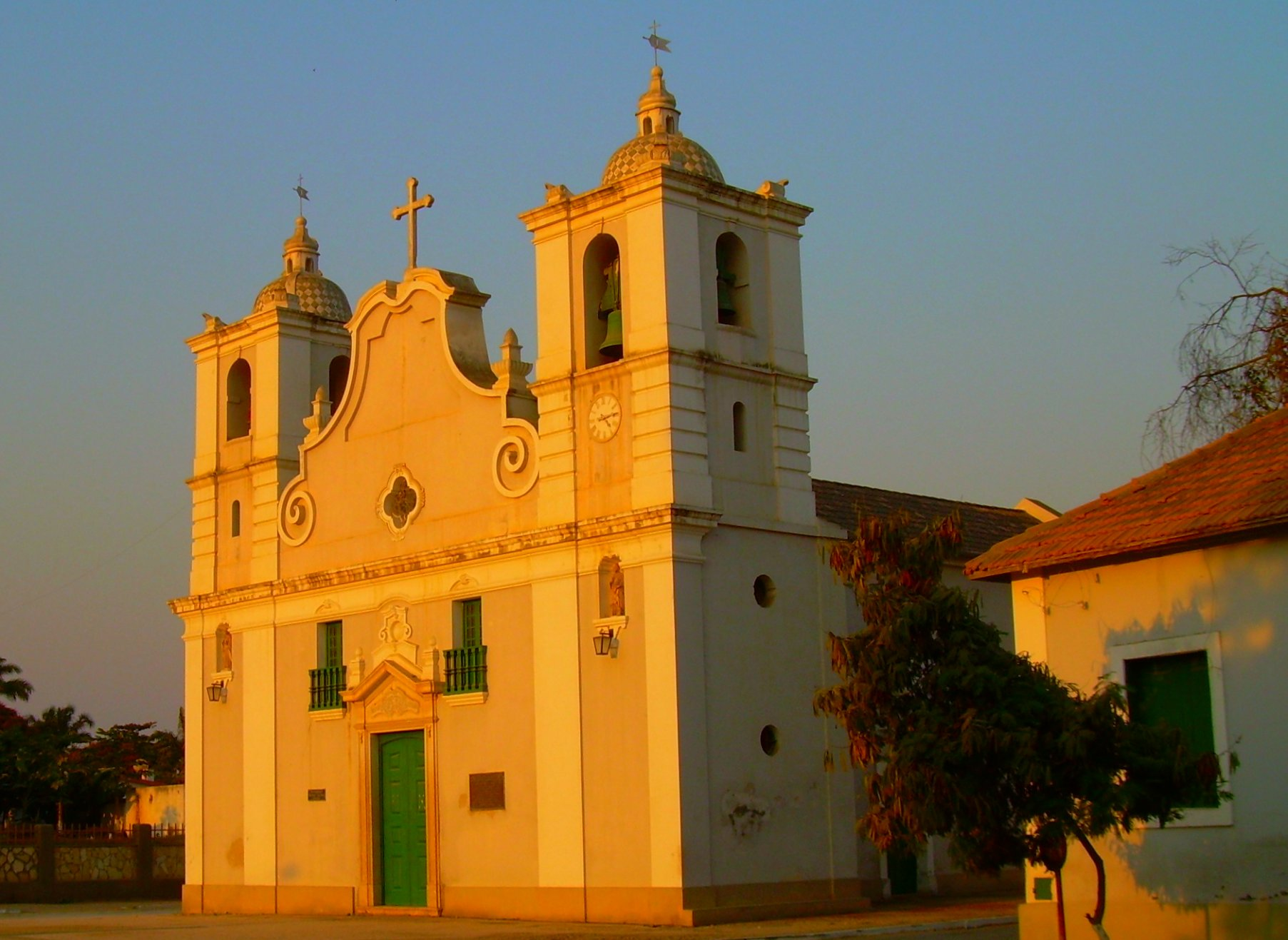
Portuguese church in Benguela

The province of Benguela contains ten municipalities (Portuguese: municípios):

- Baía-Farta
- Balombo
- Benguela
- Bocoio
- Caimbambo
- Catumbela
- Chongorói
- Cubal
- Ganda
- Lobito

== Communes ==
The province of Benguela contains the following communes (Portuguese: comunas); sorted by their respective municipalities:

- Baia-Farta Municipality: – Baía-Farta, Calohanga (Kalohanga), Dombe Grande, Equimina
- Balombo Municipality: – Balombo, Chindumbo (Chidumbo), Chingongo (Chigongo), Maca Mombolo
- Benguela Municipality: – Benguela; which is subdivided into six zones
- Bocoio Municipality: – Bocoio, Cavimbe, Chila, Cubal do Lumbo, Monte Belo, Passe
- Caimbambo Municipality: – Caiave, Caimbambo, Canhamela, Catengue, Viangombe
- Catumbela Municipality: – Biópio, Catumbela, Gama, Praia Bebe
- Chongorói Municipality: – Bolongueira (Bolongueira), Camuine (Kamuine), Chongorói
- Cubal Municipality: – Capupa, Cubal, Iambala (Imbala), Tumbulo (Lomaum)
- Ganda Municipality: – Babaera, Casseque (Kasseque), Chicuma (Chikuma), Ebanga, Ganda
- Lobito Municipality: – Canjala, Egipto Praia (Egito), Lobito-Canata

== Culture ==
The predominant ethnic groups are the Ovimbundu and Ngangela. The majority language is Umbundu.

== List of governors of Benguela ==
Name	Years in office
Sócrates Mendonça de Oliveira Dáskalos	1974–1977
Estêvão Gungo Arão	1976–1977
José Ilídio Tehilekesse Manjenje	1977
Luís Doukui Paulo de Castro	1977
Garcia Lourenço Vaz Contreiras	1977–1979
Julião Mateus Paulo a.k.a. Dino Matross	1979–1981
Kundi Paihama	1981–1986
João Manuel Gonçalves Lourenço	1986–1989
Paulo Teixeira Jorge	1989–1995
Dumilde das Chagas Rangel	1995–2009
Armando da Cruz Neto	2009–2013
Isaac Francisco Maria dos Anjos	2013–2017
Rui Luís Falcão Pinto de Andrade	2017–2021
Luís da Fonseca Nunes	2021–

Up to 1991, the official name was Provincial Commissioner.
