= Ganda, Angola =

Ganda
- Municipality and town
- Location in Angola
- Coordinates: 13°01′S 14°38′E
- Country: Angola
- Province: Benguela Province

Area
  - Municipality and town: 1,860 sq mi (4,817 km^{2})

Population (2014 Census)
  - Municipality and town: 235,486
  - Density: 126.6/sq mi (48.89/km^{2})
  - Urban: 65,000
- Time zone: UTC+1 (WAT)
- Climate: Aw

Ganda is a town and municipality in Benguela Province in Angola. The municipality had a population of 235,486 in 2014.

== History ==
During the colonial period, the town was called Vila Mariano Machado having been promoted to such category on June 24, 1969.

== Transport ==
=== Railway ===
It lies on the central line of Angolan Railways where there is a junction.
