= Vicente Carlos Kiaziku =

Angolan Catholic prelate (born 1957)

The Most Reverend Vicente Carlos Kiaziku
- Bishop of Mbanza Congo, Angola
- Church: Catholic Church
- Archdiocese: Roman Catholic Archdiocese of Luanda
- See: Roman Catholic Diocese of Mbanza Congo
- Appointed: 5 January 2009
- Installed: 8 March 2009
- Predecessor: Serafim Shyngo-Ya-Hombo
- Successor: Incumbent

Orders
- Ordination: 2 June 1985
- Consecration: 8 March 2009 by Anastácio Cahango
- Rank: Bishop

Personal details
- Born: Vicente Carlos Kiaziku; 28 June 1957 (age 68) Kimacaka-Bamba, Diocese of Uíje, Angola

Styles of Vicente Carlos Kiaziku
- Reference style: Your Lordship; The Most Reverend
- Spoken style: His Lordship
- Religious style: Bishop

Vicente Carlos Kiaziku OFMCap (born 28 June 1957) is an Angolan Roman Catholic prelate who is the bishop of the Roman Catholic Diocese of Mbanza Congo in Angola since 5 Jan 2009. Before that, from 2 June 1985 until he was appointed bishop, he was a priest of the Order of Friars Minor Capuchin. He was appointed bishop by Pope Benedict XVI. He was consecrated and installed at M'banza-Kongo on 8 March 2009.

== Background and education ==
He was born on 28 August 1957 at Kimacaka-Bamba, in the Roman Catholic Diocese of Uíje, in Uíge Province in Angola. He attended elementary and secondary schools in his home country. He studied philosophy at a seminary in Angola. He studied theology at the School of Theology of the Capuchin Friars in Venice, Italy. He joined the Order of Friars Minor Capuchin while there. He holds a Licentiate in Education Science, awarded by the Salesian Pontifical University in Rome.

== Priest ==
He became a member of the Order of Friars Minor Capuchin on 22 September 1974. On 28 September 1975, he made his preliminary vows as a member of the same religious Order. He took his perpetual vows on 10 June 1984. He was ordained a priest on 2 June 1985. He served as a priest until 5 January 2009.

As a priest, he served in various roles and locations, including:

- Responsible for formation of the Capuchin Friars in the Vice-Province of Angola
- Lecturer at the Uíje Major Seminary.
- Master of Capuchin postulants and novices.
- First councilor of the vice-province of Angola.
- General councilor for Africa.
- Councilor general of the Order of Friars Minor Capuchin since 17 July 2000.

== Bishop ==
On 5 January 2009, Pope Benedict XVI appointed Reverend Father Vicente Carlos Kiaziku, OFMCap as bishop of the diocese of Mbanza Congo in Angola. He was consecrated and installed at M'banza Kongo on 8 March 2009. The Principal Consecrator was Anastácio Cahango, Titular Bishop of Thignica and Auxiliary Bishop of Lunda and Giovanni Angelo Becciu, Titular Archbishop of Rusellae and Papal Nuncio and Filomeno do Nascimento Vieira Dias, Bishop of Cabinda. As of 2025, he is still the local ordinary at the diocese of Mbanza Congo.

== See also ==
- Catholic Church in Angola

== Succession table ==
Catholic Church titles
| Preceded by Serafim Shyngo-Ya-Hombo (29 May 1992 - 17 July 2008) | Bishop of Mbanza Congo (5 January 2009) | Succeeded by Incumbent |
