= Eunice Nangueve Inácio =

Angolan peace activist (born 1948)

- Born: 1948 (age 77–78); Huambo Province, Angola
- Education: University of KwaZulu-Natal

Eunice Nangueve Inácio (born 1948) is an Angolan peace activist.

== Biography ==
Inácio was born in 1948 into a protestant family in the Huambo Province, Angola.

In 1985, Inácio headed the welfare program in the Ministry of Social Affairs of Angola.

During the Angolan Civil War, from 1992 Inácio ran humanitarian programs for children in Huambo. She then coordinated the National Program for Family Tracing of Separated Children after the first cease fire in 1995. From 2000, Inácio developed and was coordinator of the Angolan civil society and ecumenical initiative, Peacebuilding Project (PCP) at the Development Workshop (DW). Inácio has contributed to academic journals about this peacebuilding work.

In 2005, Inácio was named a Nobel Peace Prize 1000 PeaceWomen Across the Globe (PWAG). The Auxiliary Bishop of the Roman Catholic Archdiocese of Luanda, Anastácio Cahango, said of her nomination was: "a recognition of her courage and leadership in the peacebuilding process."

In 2008, Inácio studied a master's degree in political science and international relations at the University of KwaZulu-Natal in South Africa, specializing in conflict resolution and peace studies.
