= Serafim Shyngo-Ya-Hombo =

Angolan Roman Catholic prelate (1945–2026)

The Most Reverend Serafim Shyngo-Ya-Hombo
- Bishop of Mbanza Congo
- Archdiocese: Luanda
- Diocese: Mbanza Congo
- Appointed: 29 May 1992
- Term ended: 17 July 2008
- Predecessor: Afonso Nteka
- Successor: Vicente Carlos Kiaziku
- Previous post: Titular Bishop of Aquae in Dacia (1990–1992)

Orders
- Ordination: 1 August 1971
- Consecration: 24 June 1990 by Alexandre do Nascimento, Fortunato Baldelli, Zacarias Kamwenho

Personal details
- Born: 6 February 1945 Quibala, Portuguese Angola
- Died: 1 January 2026 (aged 80) Windhoek, Namibia

Serafim Shyngo-Ya-Hombo (6 February 1945 – 1 January 2026) was an Angolan Roman Catholic prelate.

Serafim Shyngo-Ya-Hombo was born in Quibala on 6 February 1945. He joined the Order of Capuchins (OFMCap) and was ordained a priest on 1 August 1971.

On 26 March 1990, Pope John Paul II appointed him auxiliary bishop of Luanda and titular bishop of Aquae in Dacia. The Archbishop of Luanda, Alexandre do Nascimento, consecrated him as a bishop on 24 June of the same year; the co-consecrators were Fortunato Baldelli (Apostolic Delegate in Angola) and Zacarias Kamwenho (Bishop of Sumbe). On 29 May 1992, he was appointed Bishop of Mbanza Congo. He resigned on 17 July 2008.

Shyngo-Ya-Hombo died on 1 January 2026 at the age of 80.

Catholic Church titles
Preceded by Afonso Nteka	Bishop of Mbanza Congo; 1992–2008	Succeeded by Vicente Carlos Kiaziku
Preceded by Martin Luluga	Titular Bishop of Aquae in Dacia; 1990–1992	Succeeded by Josef Kajnek
