= Aquae in Dacia =

Roman Catholic titular see

Aquae in Dacia (or Aquæ in Dacia) is a former ancient city and bishopric, now a Latin Catholic titular see. Its location is modern Vidonac, in Serbia.

== History ==
As a city in the Roman province of Dacia Ripensis, it was important enough to become a suffragan bishopric of the Metropolitan of provincial capital Ratiaria (Raziaria), yet would later fade with the town.

=== Titular see ===
The diocese was nominally restored in 1925 as a titular bishopric.

It has had the following incumbents, so far of the fitting lowest (episcopal) rank:

- Tomislav Jablanović (1970.11.16 – death 1986.09.10), as Auxiliary Bishop of Vrhbosna (Sarajavo, Bosnia and Herzegovina) (1970.11.16 – 1986.09.10)
- Martin Luluga (1986.10.17 – 1990.02.08), as Auxiliary Bishop of Gulu (Uganda) (1986.10.17 – 1988.01.10) and Apostolic Administrator of Gulu (1988.01.10 – 1990.02.08), succeeding as Bishop of Gulu (1990.02.08 – 1999.01.02) and finally Bishop of Nebbi (Uganda) (1999.01.02 – retired 2011.02.08)
- Serafim Shyngo-Ya-Hombo, Capuchin Franciscans (O.F.M. Cap.) (1990.03.26 – 1992.05.29), as Auxiliary Bishop of Luanda (Angola) (1990.03.26 – 1992.05.29), later Bishop of Mbanza Congo (Angola) (1992.05.29 – retired 2008.07.17)
- Josef Kajnek (1992.11.04 – current), Auxiliary Bishop of Hradec Králové (Czech Republic)

== Sources and external links ==
- GigaCatholic, with titular incumbent biography links
