= Giovanni Angelo Becciu =

Italian convicted criminal and prelate of the Roman Catholic Church

His Eminence Giovanni Angelo Becciu
- Cardinal-Deacon of San Lino
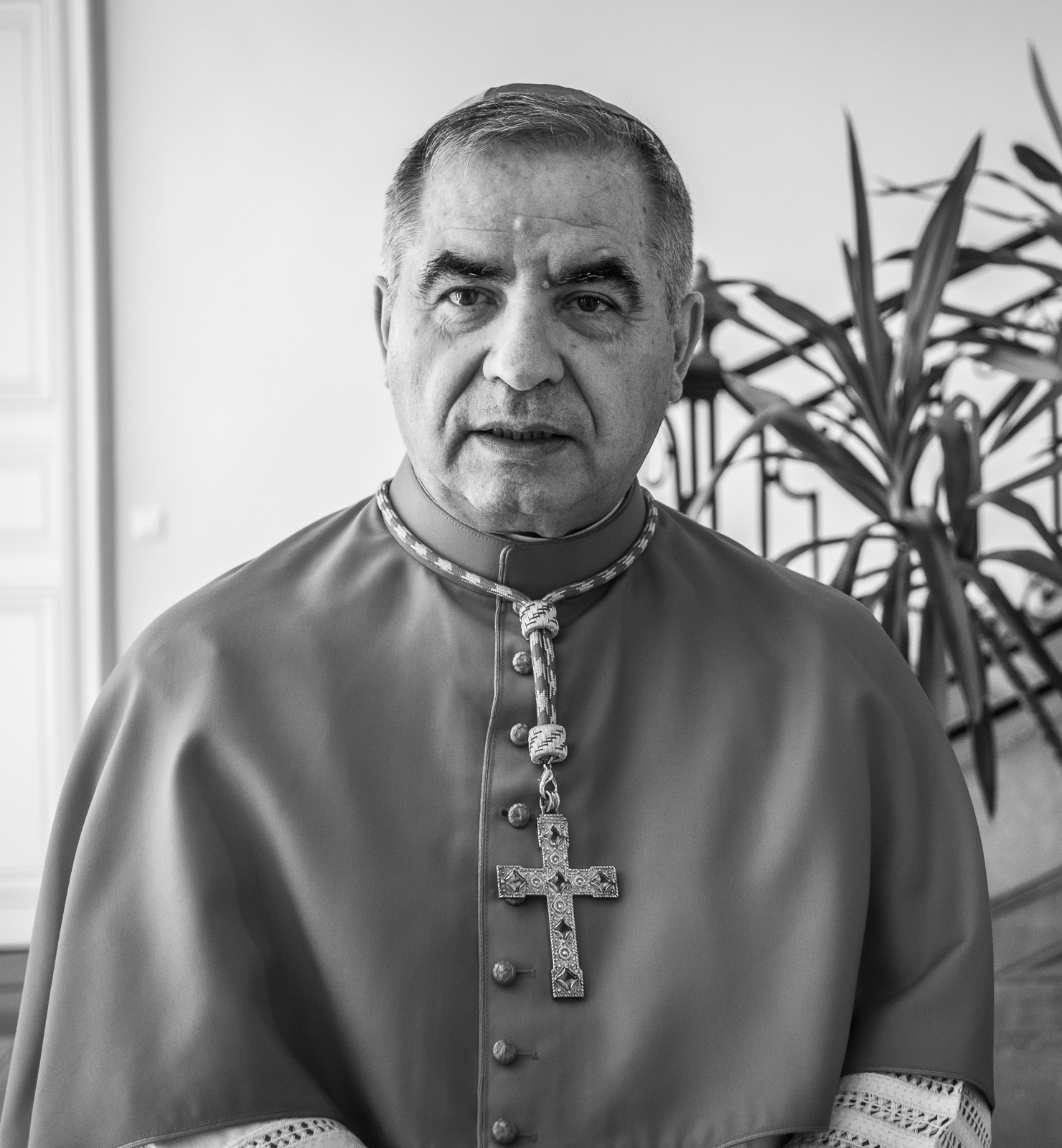
- Becciu in 2018
- Church: Catholic Church
- Appointed: 28 June 2018
- Installed: 20 January 2019
- Predecessor: Giovanni Coppa
- Previous posts: Titular Archbishop of Rusellae (2001–2018); Apostolic Nuncio to Angola (2001–2009); Apostolic Nuncio to São Tomé and Príncipe (2001–2009); Apostolic Nuncio to Cuba (2009–2011); Substitute for General Affairs (2011–2018); Prefect of the Congregation for the Causes of Saints (2018–2020); Special Delegate to the Sovereign Military Order of Malta (2017–2020)

Orders
- Ordination: 27 August 1972 by Francesco Cogoni
- Consecration: 1 December 2001 by Angelo Sodano
- Created cardinal: 28 June 2018 by Pope Francis
- Rank: Cardinal deacon

Personal details
- Born: Giovanni Angelo Becciu; 2 June 1948 (age 78) Pattada, Sardinia, Italy
- Denomination: Roman Catholic
- Education: Pontifical Ecclesiastical Academy
- Motto: Custos sanctitatis charitas
- Coat of arms: Giovanni Angelo Becciu's coat of arms

Ordination history
History
Priestly ordination
- Ordained by: Francesco Cogoni
Episcopal consecration
- Principal consecrator: Angelo Cardinal Sodano
- Co-consecrators: Paolo Cardinal Romeo, and Sebastiano Sanguinetti
Cardinalate
- Elevated by: Pope Francis
Episcopal succession
Bishops consecrated by Giovanni Angelo Becciu as principal consecrator
- Almeida Kanda: 23 October 2005
- Mateus Feliciano Augusto Tomás: 21 June 2009
- Antonio Mura: 25 March 2014
- Corrado Melis: 13 September 2015
Styles of Giovanni Angelo Becciu
- Reference style: His Eminence
- Spoken style: Your Eminence
- Religious style: Cardinal
- Informal style: Cardinal

Giovanni Angelo Becciu (Italian: [dʒoˈvanni ˈandʒelo ˈbɛttʃu], Sardinian: [ˈbetʃu]; born 2 June 1948) is a Sardinian Catholic prelate and convicted criminal who was prefect of the Congregation for the Causes of Saints from 2018 until his resignation under duress in 2020. Pope Francis had made him a cardinal in 2018. On 24 September 2020, Becciu resigned the rights associated with the cardinalate while retaining the title of cardinal. In July 2021, a Vatican judge ordered Becciu and nine others to stand trial on charges of embezzlement, abuse of office and subornation. On 16 December 2023, the Vatican announced that he had been found guilty and sentenced to five years and six months imprisonment, permanent disqualification from public office, and a fine of €8,000.

An archbishop since 2001, he held several appointments in the diplomatic service of the Holy See between 1984 and 2011, including those of Apostolic Nuncio to Angola and to Cuba. From 2011 to 2018 he was Substitute for General Affairs in the Secretariat of State, a key position in the Roman Curia. He was head of the Congregation for the Causes of Saints from 2018 to 2020, when he resigned after being implicated in a financial corruption scandal. In 2021, he was charged with embezzlement, abuse of office and subornation in connection with an investment in London real estate. Becciu said he was innocent and "the victim of a conspiracy". Becciu's trial was the first criminal trial of a cardinal in a Vatican court. He was convicted in the Vatican in December 2023 and sentenced to 5 1/2 years in prison.

== Early years ==
Becciu was born in 1948 in Pattada, Sassari, Sardinia. After completing his studies in theology and philosophy, he was ordained to the priesthood on 27 August 1972. He attended the Pontifical Ecclesiastical Academy, where he earned a doctoral degree in canon law.

== In diplomatic service ==
He entered the diplomatic service of the Holy See on 1 May 1984. He worked at the missions in Central African Republic, Sudan, New Zealand, Liberia, Great Britain, France, and the United States. Becciu knows French, English, Spanish, Sardinian, and Portuguese.

=== Nuncio to Angola ===
On 15 October 2001, Pope John Paul II appointed him Apostolic Nuncio to Angola and Titular Archbishop of Rusellae. On 15 November, he was appointed Apostolic Nuncio to São Tomé and Principe as well. He received his episcopal consecration on 1 December 2001 from Cardinal Angelo Sodano with co-consecrators Archbishop Paolo Romeo, a Vatican diplomat, and Bishop Sebastiano Sanguinetti, who hailed from Becciu's native diocese in Sardinia.

Becciu "played a crucial rôle" in the controversial 2005 appointment of Filomeno do Nascimento Vieira Dias, then auxiliary bishop of Luanda, as bishop of Cabinda in Angola. Because he was not from Cabinda and because of his family links to the regime of José Eduardo dos Santos, Vieira Dias's appointment was met with massive protests by Cabindan Catholics, and his installation was delayed for well over a year. The controversy around Vieira Dias's nomination resulted in the beating of Apostolic Administrator Eugenio Dal Corso while he was preparing to celebrate mass, the suspension of a number of priests, and a protracted strike in which many Cabindan clergy refused to celebrate mass for several months. In response, Becciu emphasized that Vieira Dias's nomination was a matter of papal prerogative and would not be revoked. Becciu went to Cabinda in order to meet with Dal Corso and with local clergy and laypeople. His meeting with laypeople was "hostile" and his car was stoned by a crowd. Vieira Dias's installation ultimately took place in June 2006.

In advance of Benedict XVI's 2009 visit to Angola, Becciu defended the pope's rejection of condoms as a means of preventing the spread of AIDS, saying "It's too easy and it's very cheap to say the solution of AIDS is the condom, you don't have the solution there.... So what the Pope is saying is that we must surpass this, because AIDS means there is a lack of understanding of the concept of true love between men and women.... Because of that, many times we are not of the same thinking as NGOs." As he left Angola for his next assignment, Becciu denounced popular belief in witchcraft that led to children being accused as sorcerers and abused: "the charges are a frequent practice on the African continent and they must be eliminated". (Note: Pope Benedict raised the subject of witchcraft and children with the bishops of Angola during their ad limina visit in November 2011, when Becciu was helping him prepare for such meetings.)

=== Nuncio to Cuba ===
On 23 July 2009, Pope Benedict named him Apostolic Nuncio to Cuba. Becciu's selection for this challenging role was seen by observers as a sign of his high reputation in Rome. Cuban President Raúl Castro praised his work on behalf of improved relations between Cuba and the Holy See.

In January 2015, after Cuba and the United States announced efforts to improve their relationship, Becciu, now the Substitute of the Secretariat of State, expressed his support for an end to the U.S. embargo, citing "the right of peoples not to be deprived of daily economic and social subsistence". He credited the thaw in relations to Pope Francis and said that he expected the Cuban government to introduce a less centralized economic system.

== Secretariat of State ==
On 10 May 2011, Pope Benedict XVI appointed Becciu to the office of Substitute for General Affairs in the Secretariat of State, replacing Fernando Filoni. The Substitute for General Affairs reports to the Cardinal Secretary of State. He usually met with the Pope each day to handle the business of the Roman Curia; his position was comparable to chief of staff. It had been described as "the most complex job in the Roman Curia" and a key to "the administrative success or failure of a papacy". Though Becciu was viewed as "a genial and effective diplomat", his appointment was unusual in that he lacked experience in the Curia. (Note: Like the Secretary of State Tarcisio Bertone, "Archbishop Giovanni Becciu, also never worked in the Secretariat, making him likewise a stranger to its palace intrigue. Becciu is cut from a different cloth in another sense, too. He's from the island of Sardinia, where people tend to think of themselves as quite different from mainland Italians–quieter, more reflective, less given to schemes and theater. Supposedly, when Benedict XVI visited Sardinia in 2008, he quipped that 'Sardinians aren't really Italians,' which may be revealing in terms of what he thought he was doing by giving Becciu the job.") It was also reported that his position as Substitute (sostituto) in the Secretariat of State also made Becciu the equivalent to being the papal chief of staff.

=== 2013 conclave ===
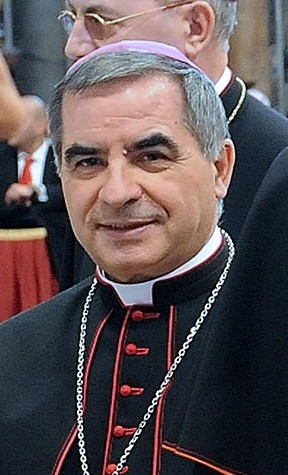
Becciu in 2013

During the conclave that followed the resignation of Benedict XVI, Becciu was responsible for directing the Vatican personnel who ensured the security and secrecy of its proceedings. A few months after his election as pope, Francis named a new Secretary of State and confirmed Becciu's appointment as Substitute.

=== Public statements ===
In his role as substitute, Becciu periodically spoke on behalf of the Vatican, addressing specific events in the news while allowing the Pope to avoid becoming involved in public debates.

==== On scandals in the Curia ====
When stolen documents about Vatican finances were leaked to the press, Becciu downplayed the sharp disagreements between Curial officials that they documented. He wrote in 2012 that some "criticize the monarchic and absolutist nature of the church's central government" but then pretend to be "scandalized because someone writing to the Pope expresses ideas or even complaints about how that government is organized. Many of the published documents do not reveal power struggles or vendettas, but the freedom of thought which the church is criticized for not allowing."

In January 2014, when retired Commander of the Swiss Guard Elmar Mäder told the Swiss weekly Sonntag that a gay network existed in the Roman Curia, Becciu condemned "generic accusations" and challenged Mäder to provide specifics: "When he was in service, did he have any suspects? Are these suspects still present? Come here and tell us exactly to whom it relates."

In January 2016, discussing books that charged the Vatican with financial mismanagement, Becciu defended Vatican employees: "The Vatican is not a den of thieves. To represent it as such constitutes an absolute falsehood. I find it extremely unjust that our employees, proudly carrying out a service for the Pope and the church, have gotten to the point, for some time now, of being ashamed to tell people they work here."

==== On Amoris laetitia ====
In December 2016, Becciu addressed reactions to Pope Francis' comments in his apostolic exhortation Amoris laetitia on the pastoral care of Catholics in irregular marriages: "I will not go into the controversies but I do wish to reiterate the principles I have always been taught by the healthy tradition of the Church: as the Pope's humble collaborator, I feel I have a duty to loyally tell him what I think when a decision is being taken. Once it is taken, I obey the Holy Father fully."

==== On same-sex unions ====
When a Catholic radio station broadcast a Dominican friar's statement that the enactment of same-sex civil unions had caused recent earthquakes, Becciu said, "They are offensive statements for believers and scandalous for those who do not believe."

==== On immigration ====
Asked about U.S. President Donald Trump's order restricting immigration in January 2017, Becciu stated: "Certainly there is concern because we are messengers of another culture, that of openness. The pope insists on the capacity for integration [of] those who arrive in our society and culture. We are builders of bridges, not of walls. Christians must be strong in reaffirming this message."

=== McCarrick scandal ===
In his August 2018 "Testimony", Archbishop Carlo Maria Viganò alleged that Becciu, as substitute, "knew in every detail the situation" regarding former Cardinal Theodore McCarrick's sexual abuse of adult priests and seminarians, reports of which had reached Rome. In his capacity as substitute, Becciu had direct contact with McCarrick on numerous occasions. In his book Il Giorno del Giudizio, Andrea Tornielli states that after each of the international trips McCarrick undertook in and around the year 2012—unauthorized trips that he was not supposed to undertake—McCarrick would send detailed reports that he addressed to the Pope, Vatican Secretary of State Bertone, and Substitute Becciu, even receiving responses of thanks from the Secretariat of State. Further, according to emails leaked by Anthony Figueiredo, a former aide to McCarrick, McCarrick had plans to meet with Becciu in person on 14 February 2013, immediately before the 2013 conclave; he was also involved in helping arrange a 2016 meeting between Pope Francis and McCarrick.

=== Substitute for General Affairs ===
Becciu, as Substitute for General Affairs, was involved in securing the freedom of a Colombian nun kidnapped by jihadists in Mali in 2017 and liberated in 2021. Pope Francis, according to Becciu had authorised paying a ransom of up to $1 million to secure Sister Gloria Cecilia Narvaez.

=== Financial dealings ===
==== Audit ====
An internal audit in 2016 was suspended on Archbishop Becciu's instruction, countermanding an order from Cardinal Pell, prefect of the secretariat of the economy.

==== IDI ====
During his time as substitute, Becciu was reportedly involved in repeated attempts to secure loans to support the Istituto Dermopatico dell'Immacolata (IDI), a struggling hospital in Rome originally owned by the Italian province of the Sons of the Immaculate Conception (PICFIC).

In July 2011, Fr. Franco Decaminada, the president of the IDI, approached Becciu with a proposal that the Vatican supply the IDI with 200 million euros to take over Milan's San Raffaele Hospital. In September 2011, Decaminada hired Becciu's niece Maria Piera Becciu as his personal secretary. The proposal to buy San Raffaele ultimately came to nothing. In October 2019, Becciu professed not to remember the proposal and stated that he "never dealt with this question."

The IDI eventually went bankrupt in 2012 with debts of more than 800 million euros. PICFIC was declared insolvent by an Italian court in 2013, and Decaminada was arrested in 2013 and, along with 40 other figures in the IDI's administration, was charged with using the hospital for embezzlement and money laundering, including the diversion of hundreds of thousands of euros of IDI money into an oil exploration company. Decaminada was sent to prison and laicized.

In February 2013, Benedict XVI appointed Cardinal Giuseppe Versaldi to govern the Congregation of the Sons of the Immaculate Conception, PICFIC's parent order, as his pontifical delegate and to be commissioner of the IDI. Late in 2014, Cardinals Versaldi and Becciu reportedly requested that the Institute for the Works of Religion (IOR), the Vatican's commercial bank, grant a 50 million euro loan to IDI in order to keep it afloat. Determining that the IDI would never be able to repay the loan, the IOR board in 2015 rejected the proposal, with Cardinal George Pell, the prefect of the Secretariat for the Economy, reportedly "vocally opposed" to it. Becciu and Versaldi subsequently requested that the Administration of the Patrimony of the Apostolic See (APSA) grant a similar 50 million euro loan to the Fondazione Luigi Maria Monti (FLMM), a for-profit partnership of the Vatican Secretariat of State and the Congregation of the Sons of the Immaculate Conception that had been created to take over the IDI and nominally replace PICFIC as the owner of the hospital. The FLMM shared some of the same leadership personnel as PICFIC and has been described as "nothing other than the friars under a different name." APSA granted the loan to the FLMM, possibly in contravention of international regulatory agreements not to provide commercial loans, and in April 2015 the FLMM acquired the IDI for a reported 131 million euros. Reportedly influenced by the lobbying of Becciu, Pope Francis subsequently withdrew oversight over APSA's investment decisions from Pell's office.

In order to remove the loan from APSA's books, officials from the Secretariat of State sought a $25 million grant in June 2017 from the U.S.-based Papal Foundation. Lay board members were reportedly initially led to believe that the loan would go to fund the IDI; in fact, the recipient of the grant was the Holy See. The grant request created internal turmoil inside the Papal Foundation and the disbursement of funds was repeatedly stalled; in the end, the $13 million already disbursed to the Holy See was reclassified as a "loan" against future foundation grants. In October 2019, APSA's head conceded that it had had to write off 30 million euros of the loan after the Papal Foundation grant was stopped. While some sources in APSA told reporters that Becciu was behind the grant request to the Papal Foundation, Becciu denied this, stating that after Pietro Parolin's assumption of the office of Secretary of State in 2013, he "no longer concerned [him]self with IDI." In November 2019, Cardinal Parolin claimed that he was personally responsible for the APSA loan to the FLMM and the request to the Papal Foundation.

==== Falcon Oil ====
At the end of 2012, Angolan businessman Antonio "Mosquito" Mbakassi, (Note: Antonio "Mosquito" Mbakassi is referred to in journalistic sources sometimes simply as "Antonio Mosquito"; his surname is sometimes spelled M'bakassi and Mbakassy; and his nickname is sometimes spelled "Mesquita.") an "oligarch" with close ties to the family of president José Eduardo dos Santos, who had met Becciu during the latter's time as nuncio to Angola, directly approached the Vatican secretariat of state to propose that the Holy See invest US$200 million in an oil exploration project to be carried out by his company Falcon Oil Holdings SA. (Note: Falcon Oil Holdings SA, registered in Panama, is not connected with Falcon Oil and Gas of West Virginia.) According to 2022 court testimony by Fabrizio Tirabassi, Becciu met with Mosquito and then asked Alberto Perlasca, the former head of the Vatican Secretariat of State's administrative office, to evaluate the proposal. Perlasca asked investment manager Enrico Crasso to assess the proposal; In turn, Credit Suisse, which served as the banker and financial adviser to the secretariat, recommended that Crasso turn to WRM, the family office and investment fund of London-based Italian financier Raffaele Mincione, to perform due diligence on the potential loan. According to Tirabassi, Mincione's study cost the Vatican $500,000 and took over a year. WRM advised against the loan on the grounds of financial and reputational risk, and the money was instead invested in a London property deal through Mincione. In 2022 court testimony, Crasso testified that he had blocked the oil investment on the grounds that it was too risky.

On 7 October 2020, Becciu's lawyer stated that Becciu had been accused of, but denied, using Holy See money to invest in Mosquito's business activities.

==== London investment ====
Unnamed sources within the Vatican alleged in 2015 that Becciu attempted to conceal a $200 million London real estate purchase in violation of accounting rules regulating creative accounting. According to statements made to a UK court by businessman Gianluigi Torzi, a broker involved in the London property deal, a lay Secretariat of State employee named Fabrizio Tirabassi "openly admitted" blackmailing Becciu.

In July 2021 a Vatican judge ordered Becciu and others to stand trial, charged with financial crimes relating to the London investment. Becciu said he was "the victim of a conspiracy" and protested his "absolute innocence". The BBC commented that the Pope's sanctioning the indictment and trial of a cardinal who was a senior member of the Vatican hierarchy and reported to be a friend of Francis indicated his intention to take unprecedented action to clean up the church's reputation regarding financial misdeeds, at the risk of publicly revealing the possible mismanagement of the Holy See's finances.

== Special Delegate to the Knights of Malta ==
On 2 February 2017, Pope Francis named him his Special Delegate to the Sovereign Military Order of Malta, following a public dispute between the Pope and the Grand Master of the Order, Matthew Festing. In a letter dated 15 April, Becciu instructed Festing not to travel to Rome for the election of his successor at the end of April. He wrote that many members of the Order felt his presence would "reopen wounds" and prevent a return to harmony. Festing disregarded this injunction, came to Rome and participated in the election of his successor. Becciu withdrew his letter.

Becciu's original mandate was to expire upon the election of a new Grand Master. When Giacomo dalla Torre del Tempio di Sanguinetto was elected Grand Master on 2 May 2018, Pope Francis extended Becciu's mandate indefinitely. On 1 November 2020, Pope Francis replaced Becciu as Special Delegate to the Sovereign Military Order of Malta with Silvano Tomasi.

== Cardinal and prefect ==
On 20 May 2018, Pope Francis announced he would make Becciu a cardinal on 28 June, and on 26 May the Holy See announced he would end his term as Substitute on 29 June and become Prefect of the Congregation for the Causes of Saints at the end of August. At the 28 June consistory, he became Cardinal-Deacon of San Lino. He was the seventh cardinal from Sardinia.

Becciu became Prefect of the Congregation for the Causes of the Saints on 31 August 2018, succeeding Cardinal Angelo Amato.

=== Financial scandal, resignation as Prefect, and renunciation of Cardinal privileges ===
On 24 September 2020, Pope Francis requested Becciu's resignation as Prefect and his renunciation of his prerogatives as a cardinal, after Becciu was accused of embezzlement and nepotism. While Becciu retained his cardinal's title, he lost his right to participate in a future papal conclave or consistory, and his right to be tried by the Pope alone. The Order of Malta later announced that his role as Special Delegate to the Knights of Malta ended in October 2020 and he was replaced in that office on 1 November. On 14 October 2020, Cecilia Marogna, a business associate of Becciu, was arrested in Milan, Italy, after she was implicated for receiving 500,000 euros (US$587,350) from funds that had been intended to finance a "parallel diplomacy" program to help African conflict zones. These funds were embezzled while Becciu was still serving as the Substitute for General Affairs in the Secretariat of State in 2018. The arrest warrant, which had been issued by the Vatican, involves embezzlement and aggravated misappropriation in complicity with others.

On 18 November 2020, Becciu sued the weekly magazine L'Espresso in civil court in Sassari, Sardinia, Italy, for ten million euros to be given to charity, claiming it had damaged his reputation and prospects of becoming pope by making unsourced claims of embezzling Vatican funds to enrich his family.

=== Vatican court indictment ===
On 3 July 2021, a Vatican judge indicted Becciu on multiple charges, including embezzlement, money laundering, fraud, extortion, and abuse of office. Pope Francis personally approved his indictment. Also indicted were nine other people, four of whom were former Vatican officials and five of whom were outsiders. The other churchmen charged were a former head and deputy head of the Vatican's internal financial monitor and two former employees of the Secretariat of State, including a priest who formerly served as secretary to Becciu. The outsiders charged included two Italian brokers and an Italian woman who worked for Becciu. After he was charged, Becciu said that he was "the victim of a plot hatched against me" and was innocent.

==== Trial ====
On 27 July 2021, the trial against him at a Holy See court opened. Becciu appeared in person in court and denied any wrongdoing. He asked the court not to order his arrest and the trial was adjourned. Becciu, who became the first Catholic Cardinal to testify in Vatican criminal court, again denied wrongdoing when he testified on 17 March 2022.

On 9 March 2023, the Vatican prosecutor Alessandro Diddi introduced correspondence between Pope Francis and Becciu as part of the evidence against Becciu. In the letters, Francis denied both to having authorized Becciu to hire a woman to help secure the release of a kidnapped nun in Mali or to invest Vatican money in a London business.

On 16 December 2023, the Vatican announced that he had been found guilty and sentenced "to five years and six months imprisonment, perpetual disqualification from public office, and an eight thousand euro fine". Becciu has indicated that he will appeal the verdict.

In 2025, Becciu attended the funeral of Pope Francis, and participated in some meetings with other prelates. Despite his renunciation of cardinal privileges, he initially asserted his right to participate in the 2025 papal conclave. In response to this assertion, Cardinal Pietro Parolin unveiled a letter signed by Pope Francis, clarifying that Becciu cannot attend the upcoming conclave. On 29 April, Becciu said he would not participate in the conclave for "the good of the church".

On 17 March 2026, the Apostolic Signatura declared a mistrial in Becciu's case due to procedural errors by the prosecution and Pope Francis. It ordered a new trial beginning on 22 June 2026.

== Honours ==
- Italy: Knight Grand Cross of the Order of Merit of the Italian Republic (18 April 2015)

== See also ==
- Cardinals created by Francis

== Notes ==
Diplomatic posts
Preceded by Aldo Cavalli	Apostolic Nuncio to Angola; 2001–2009	Succeeded by Novatus Rugambwa
Preceded by Luigi Bonazzi	Apostolic Nuncio to Cuba; 2009–2011	Succeeded by Bruno Musarò
Catholic Church titles
Preceded by Fernando Filoni	Substitute for General Affairs of the Secretariat of State; 2011–2018	Succeeded by Edgar Peña Parra
Preceded by Giovanni Coppa	Cardinal-Deacon of San Lino; 2018–present	Incumbent
New office	Special Delegate to the Sovereign Military Order of Malta; 2017–2020	Succeeded by Silvano Maria Tomasi
Preceded by Angelo Amato	Prefect of the Congregation for the Causes of Saints; 2018–2020	Succeeded by Marcello Semeraro
