= San Lino, Rome =

San Lino
- Saint Linus
- Italian: Chiesa di San Lino; Latin: Ecclesia Sancti Lini
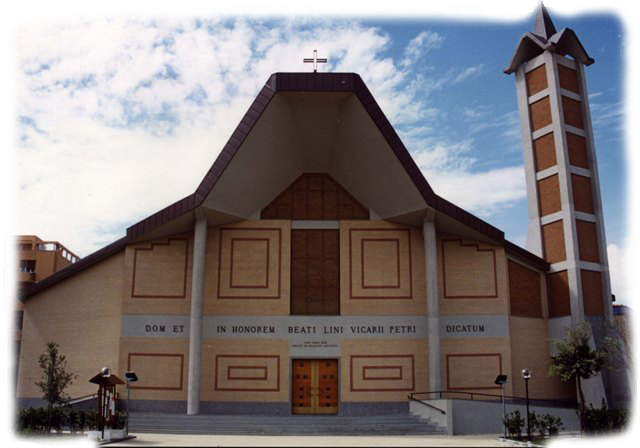
- The church's façade.

- Location within Rome
- 41.9129°N 12.4226°E
- Location: Via Cardinale Garampi 60; Rome
- Country: Italy
- Denomination: Roman Catholic
- Tradition: Roman Rite
- Website: www.parrocchiasanlino.org

History
- Status: Parish church and Diaconate
- Dedication: Pope St. Linus
- Dedicated: 23 September 1999
- Consecrated: 23 September 1999

Architecture
- Functional status: Active
- Architect: Renato Costa
- Architectural type: Church
- Completed: 1999

Administration
- Province: Rome
- Diocese: Rome

San Lino is a parish church and cardinal diaconate located in Rome on Via Cardinale Garampi 60 in the Primavalle quarter with the church's main entrance found on Via della Pineta Sacchetti. The church is dedicated to Pope Saint Linus.

The current Cardinal-Deacon for this church is Giovanni Angelo Becciu who is the second cardinal protector for the church since it became a diaconate in late 2007.

== Background ==
On 22 February 1957, Cardinal Clemente Micara erected the parish in the decree Qua celeritate. It used a temporary location until a building was completed in 1999 according to the plans of architect Renato Costa. Cardinal Camillo Ruini dedicated the church on 23 September 1999 to Pope Saint Linus.

Pope Benedict XVI issued the papal bull Purpuratis Patribus on 24 November 2007 that made the church a cardinal diaconate and assigned the church its first cardinal-deacon, Giovanni Coppa.

== Cardinal-Deacons ==
- Giovanni Coppa (24 November 2007 - 16 May 2016)
- Giovanni Angelo Becciu (28 June 2018 – present)

== See also ==
- Churches of Rome
