= Paulino Fernandes Madeca =

- Bishop of Cabinda
- Church: Catholic Church
- Diocese: Diocese of Cabinda
- In office: 2 July 1984 – 11 February 2005
- Predecessor: Diocese erected
- Successor: Filomeno do Nascimento Vieira Dias
- Previous posts: Titular Bishop of Egnatia (1983-1984); Auxiliary Bishop of Luanda (1983-1984)

Orders
- Ordination: 20 July 1958
- Consecration: 9 October 1983 by Fortunato Baldelli

Personal details
- Born: 28 November 1927 Povo Grande, Cabinda, Protectorate of Portuguese Congo, Portuguese Empire
- Died: 9 January 2008 (aged 80) Luanda, Angola

Paulino Fernandes Madeca (born 28 November 1927, Chingolo, Cabinda, Angola; died 9 January 2008, Luanda, Angola) was a Catholic Bishop of Cabinda.

== Life ==
Madeca entered a seminary in 1940. He subsequently studied theology and philosophy in Luanda and was ordained to the priesthood on 20 July 1958.

On 22 July 1983 Pope John Paul II appointed him titular bishop of Egnatia and auxiliary bishop in the Roman Catholic Archdiocese of Luanda. He was consecrated by Archbishop Fortunato Baldelli, on 9 October of the same year; coconsecrating were Eduardo André Muaca, Archbishop of Luanda, and Oscar Lino Lopes Fernandes Braga, Bishop of Benguela. On 2 July 1984 he was transferred to the Diocese of Cabinda.

Madeca resigned on 11 February 2005. He died on 9 January 2008, at the Military Hospital of Luanda; he is buried in Cabinda.
