= Belmiro Cuica Chissengueti =

Angolan Catholic bishop

- Bishop of Cabinda
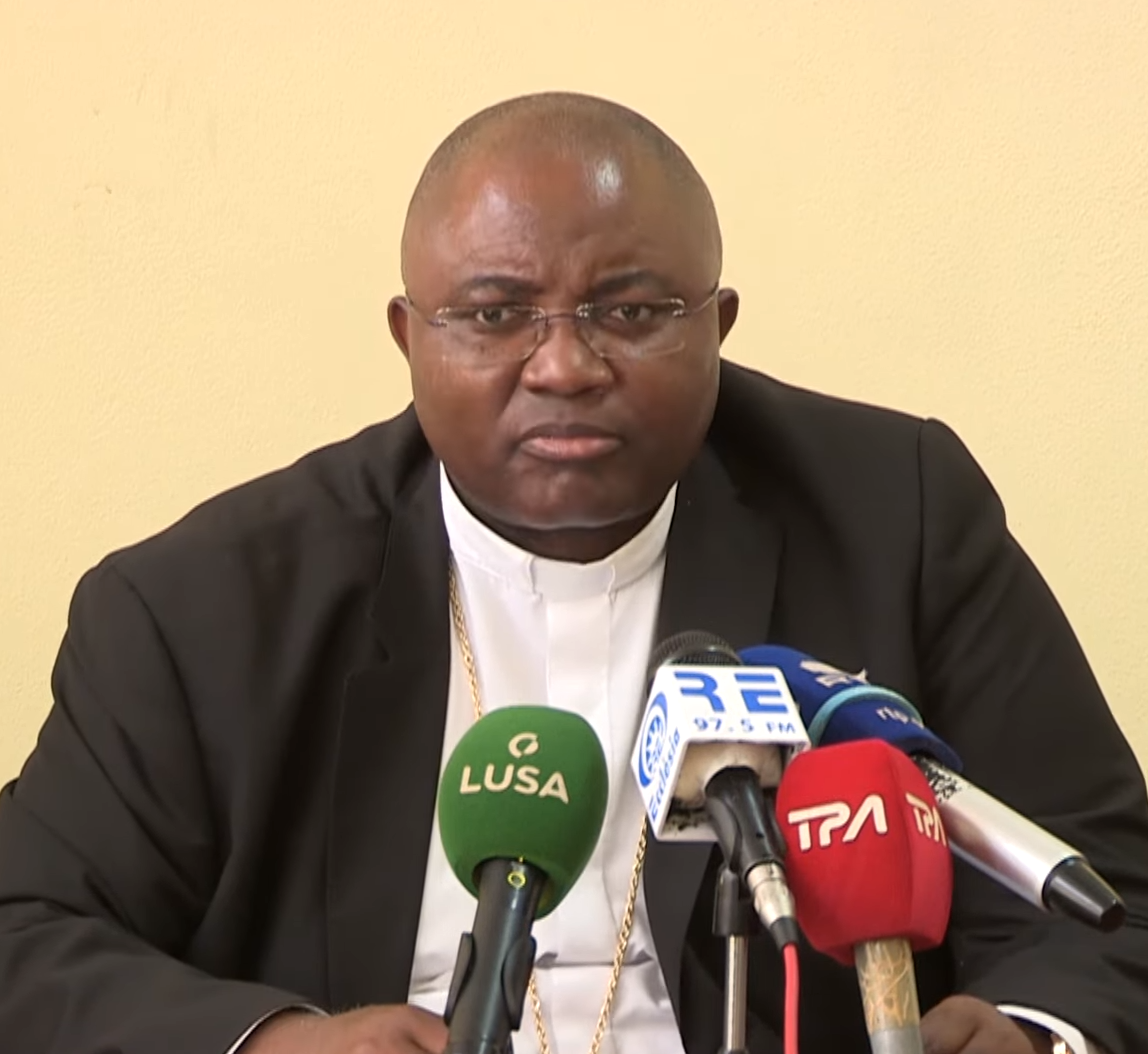
- Church: Catholic
- See: Cabinda
- Appointed: 3 July 2018
- Installed: 7 October 2018
- Predecessor: Filomeno do Nascimento Vieira Dias

Orders
- Ordination: 5 May 1996
- Consecration: 30 September 2018 by Filomeno do Nascimento Vieira Dias

Personal details
- Born: March 5, 1969 (age 57) Chinguar, Bié Province, Angola
- Motto: Cor Unum et Anima Una

Belmiro Cuica Chissengueti C.S.Sp. (born 5 March 1969) is an Angolan prelate of the Catholic Church who has been bishop of Cabinda since 2018. He serves as the spokesperson for Angolan bishops on political and social affairs, and for his social media presence has been called the bishop of the diocese of Facebook.

== Early life ==
Belmiro Cuica Chissengueti was born on 5 March 1969 in the town of Chinguar in Bié, a province in Central Angola. He was not raised a Catholic but was instead along with his parents a member of the Congregational Evangelical Church in Angola. He studied at the preparatory seminary of the Congregation of the Holy Spirit (Spiritans or Holy Ghost Fathers) in Lândana, Cabinda, and entered the major seminary in Huambo in 1984. He made his perpetual vows as a Spiritan on 5 August 1995 and was ordained a priest on 5 May 1996.

He later studied civil law at the Catholic University of Angola and earned a licentiate from the Pablo de Olavide University in Spain.

His assignments have included postings as parish vicar and then parish priest of São João Baptista di Lobita in the Diocese of Benguela and a member of the presbyteral council of the that diocese from 1996 to 2000; counsellor of the Spiritans in Angola from 1997 to 2004; parish priest of São Pedro Apóstolo in Luanda from 2000 to 2016; episcopal vicar for social pastoral care for the Archdiocese of Luanda from 2001 to 2009; a member of the presbyteral council of that archdiocese from 2002 to 2003; first counsellor of Spiritans in Angola from 2004 to 2013; secretary of the Episcopal Commission for Justice and Peace of the Conference of Bishop of Angola and São Tomé (CEAST) from 2010 to 2014; episcopal vicar of the Vicariate of São Pedro from 2010 to 2018; a member of the ecclesiastical court of the archdiocese of Luanda from 2013 to 2018; and provincial superior of the Spiritans in Angola from 2016 to 2018.

In 2009, he was named, as secretary of the CEAST Commission for Justice and Peace, an expert participant for the Synod of Bishops on Africa that met in the Vatican in October.

== Bishop ==
On 3 July 2018, Pope Francis named him bishop of Cabinda. He received his episcopal consecration in Luanda on 30 September from Filomeno do Nascimento Vieira Dias, Archbishop of Luanda, his predecessor in Cabinda. He was installed in Cabinda on 7 October. Aware of the diocese' history of conflict when its last bishop was appointed in 2005, he chose as his motto "one heart and one soul". He reported that he found no evidence of a divided community and even had "a very healthy relationship" with a group of former Catholics who had formed their own church in 2005–06.

In November 2019, he suspended one of his priests, Félix Roberto Cubola Kinyumba, for engaging in political activities incompatible with his priestly ministry in violation of canon law, specifically assuming the presidency of the High Council of Cabinda, an organization that seeks to negotiate with the Angolan government.

Assessing his challenges in May 2021 on the 25th anniversary of his ordination, he said:

The Church must not be afraid to get her hands dirty to defend her brothers and, at the same time, must be interventionist, not only in terms of evangelization, but also in social commitment.

He emphasized the need to move forward on local development projects and minimizing the use of non-local labor, for local educational institutions, and for rural development to counteract migration to the cities. Accomplishing his goals, he said, would require more professional management of government economic policy otherwise Angola could become a failed state.

He has continued to serve as spokesperson for CEAST. In October 2021, he recommended the government declare a food emergency in the drought-affected southern part of Angola to allow international aid into the region. He counseled the government not to "confuse hunger with the political issue". In November 2021, he recorded an extensive critique of the national political leadership that went viral. He described their impoverished mentality that made it impossible to address the nation's poverty. He said:

You don't have a job for your own sons and daughters, but you call in advisors from all over. When your head is only 140 kilobytes, there's no point in being a leader, because you're going to need advisors who are at least a gig or two, and you won't understand anything about your staff yourself.

He described government officials traveling expensively and sending groups to international conferences, instead of admitting to the country's limited resources and sending one delegate whose seriousness would win an audience. He said they are ashamed to appear poor and instead waste resources to prop up their egos. In January 2022, he urged government leaders to meet with protesters and use dialog to address demand for youth employment and avert increasingly radical social conflict.
