= Cathedral of the Holy Saviour of Congo =

Coordinates: 6°15′52.60″S 14°14′44.54″E

- Sé Catedral de São Salvador de Congo
- Kulumbimbi
- Cathedral of the Holy Saviour of Congo
- Location: M'banza-Kongo
- Country: Angola
- Denomination: Roman Catholic Church

The Cathedral of the Holy Saviour of Congo (Portuguese: Sé Catedral de São Salvador de Congo; Kongo: kulumbimbi) was a Catholic church built at the end of the 15th century in M'banza-Kongo, the capital of the Kingdom of Kongo. It was the first cathedral of the Diocese of Angola and Congo and one of the first Catholic cathedrals in sub-Saharan Africa and in what is now known as Angola.

The construction as a simple church, which later would be a cathedral, was initiated between the 6th of May and the 6 of July 1491 under João I of Kongo. Later it would be repaired and extended by 1534, under the reign of Afonso I. By 1570, under the reign of Álvaro I, the East Jagas towns briefly took the city, burning the church, which was later rebuilt.

It was elevated to the status of cathedral in 1596, already under the king Álvaro II. This same monarch tried in 1613, through Pope Paul V, that the king of Portugal took care of the cost of the maintenance of the bishops and canons of the cathedral.

The city was sacked several times during the Kongo Civil War, that followed the Battle of Mbwila of 1665, the first of them in 1668, and was abandoned in 1678, after being destroyed by the troops of the pretender to the throne Pedro III, leaving the Cathedral in ruins.

== See also ==
- Catholic Church in Angola
- Holy Saviour
