= Mbanza =

Mbanza, or M'banza, may refer to:

== Places ==
Angola

- M'banza-Kongo, a city in Zaire Province
- Mbanza-Soyo (officially Soyo), a city in Zaire Province

DR Congo

- Mbanza-Ngungu, a city in Bas-Congo Province

== Other ==
- Mbanza language, a Ubangian language spoken in Central Africa
- Mbanza Congo Airport, an airport in M'banza Kongo, Angola
