= Cuba–Holy See relations =

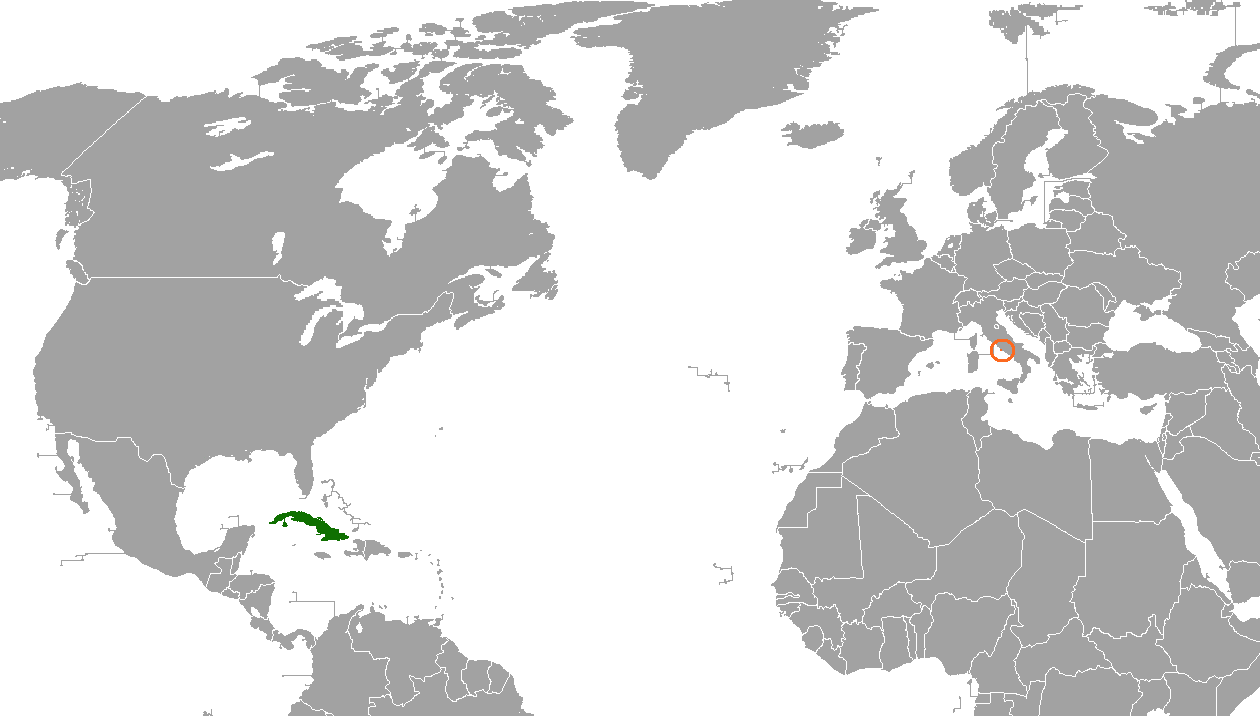

- Cuba: Holy See

Cuba–Holy See relations are foreign relations between the Holy See and the Republic of Cuba. Three Popes have visited Cuba: John Paul II, Benedict XVI, and Francis.

== History ==
Following the 1959 Cuban Revolution, Prime Minister Fidel Castro embraced Marxism-Leninism and greater ties with the Soviet Union. In the communist tradition, Castro imposed state atheism, restricting the role that religion could play in the country. However, religious suppression never reached the same levels that it did in many other communist states, and the Holy See never broke off diplomatic relations with Cuba.

The Catholic clergy, in Rome, the United States, and Cuba itself, have generally taken a policy of opposing the American embargo on Cuba, citing humanitarian reasons.

In December 1989, Cardinal Roger Etchegaray, then president of the Pontifical Council for Justice and Peace (a former dicastery of the Roman Curia) visited Cuba to dialogue with Castro about church-state relations. Castro said he would welcome the Pope if he visited Cuba, and dialogue with local and Vatican bishops continued. In July 1994 Cardinal Bernardin Gantin, president of the Pontifical Commission for the Central America, met with Castro in Havana. Subsequently, Cardinal Gantin told Pope John Paul II of the improvements of religious freedom in Cuba, and two years later John Paul received Castro in Rome.

In 1998, John Paul became the first Pope to set foot in Cuba. In the tradition of Catholic social teaching, he criticized both the authoritarian socialism of Cuba and the currents of neoliberal capitalism spreading around many other parts of the world.

In 2012, Pope Benedict XVI visited Cuba, meeting with Castro's brother, Raul, who had by then become president. He also implied criticism of the Marxist model.

In 2015, Pope Francis became the third Pope to visit Cuba, acting as a mediator between Cuba and the United States, eventually leading to the Cuban thaw under US presidents Obama and Trump. Cuban authorities released prisoners as a show of goodwill, but dissident groups claim that many of the nation's political prisoners remained incarcerated despite that. The illegal, underground opposition say that the papacy's gentle criticisms of repression on the island have not and will not effect real political change in the country.

== Tensions ==
When Pope Francis visited Cuba, he reiterated the Catholic Church's stance on freedom of religion, urging the government to allow Cubans the "freedom, the means and the space" to exercise their faith, and he quoted Cuban national hero José Martí's stance against "dynasties", possibly a reference to the Castro brothers' hold on power (though a Vatican spokesman said the pontiff's words were not in reference to current events. Francis also called for "justice, peace, liberty and reconciliation" for the Cuban nation and people, a reference to his calls for greater human dignity and to the human rights situation in the country.

== See also ==
- Roman Catholicism in Cuba
- Apostolic Nunciature to Cuba
- Human rights in Cuba
- Religion in Cuba
