= Filomeno do Nascimento Vieira Dias =

Angolan prelate of the Catholic Church (born 1958)

- Archbishop of Luanda
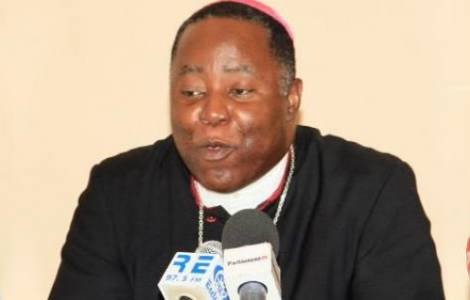
- Archdiocese: Luanda
- Appointed: 8 December 2014
- Installed: 24 January 2015
- Predecessor: Alexandre do Nascimento
- Previous posts: Auxiliary Bishop of Luanda (2003–05); Bishop of Cabinda (2005–14); Apostolic Administrator of Cabinda (2015–18)

Orders
- Ordination: 30 October 1983
- Consecration: 11 January 2004 by: Alexandre do Nascimento; Giovanni Angelo Becciu; Damião António Franklin

Personal details
- Born: Filomeno do Nascimento Vieira Dias; 18 April 1958 (age 68) Luanda, Angola
- Education: Pontifical Lateran University; Pontifical Gregorian University; Catholic University of Paris

Filomeno do Nascimento Vieira Dias (born 18 April 1958) is an Angolan prelate of the Catholic Church who has been Archbishop of Luanda since 2015; he was an auxiliary bishop there from 2003 to 2005. He was Bishop of Cabinda from 2005 to 2014, where his lack of identification with the province and its separatist movement initially made his appointment controversial and he was only installed after sixteen months.

== Family background ==
Vieira Dias belongs to a well-known Angolan family with strong links to the People's Movement for the Liberation of Angola (MPLA). He is the cousin once removed of General Hélder Vieira Dias, known as “Kopelipa,” a member of the inner circle of José Eduardo dos Santos, who was president of Angola from 1979 to 2017. He is also the great-nephew of the musician and political activist Liceu Vieira Dias, who was a founder of the band Ngola Ritmos as well as of the MPLA, and the cousin once removed of musician Ruy Mingas, who wrote the music for "Angola Avante", Angola's national anthem.

== Formation and early career ==
Vieira Dias studied in the Capuchin minor seminary in Luanda and in the major seminary of Cristo Rei in Huambo. He earned a licentiate in theology at the Pontifical Urban University, a doctorate in theology from the Pontifical Lateran University and a licentiate in philosophy from the Pontifical Gregorian University. He studied journalism in Luanda and at the Catholic University of Paris. He also has a diploma in juridical-administrative practices from the Congregation for the Clergy in Rome. He was ordained a priest on 30 October 1983.

Following his ordination, Dias worked as a parish vicar and as pastor to various local religious communities; rector of the minor and major seminaries of Luanda; vice-rector of the Catholic University of Angola; a lecturer in philosophy, fundamental theology, African history, African philosophy, contemporary philosophy, and theological ethics. He served on several diocesan committees and was a member of the Jacques Maritain International Association for development studies. He served on the Supervisory Board of the Association of Portuguese Language Universities and was a member of the Boston-based Angola Educational Assistance Fund and of the Scientific Society of the Catholic University of Portugal.

Pope John Paul II appointed Vieira Dias titular bishop of Fiumepiscense and auxiliary bishop of Luanda on 25 October 2003 and he was consecrated a bishop on 11 January 2004.

== Bishop of Cabinda ==
On 11 February 2005, Vieira Dias was appointed Bishop of Cabinda by John Paul II. His personal ties to Cabinda were limited to a period as a parish minister early in his career. Because he was not from Cabinda and because of his family links to the regime of José Eduardo dos Santos, Vieira Dias’s appointment was controversial and was met with massive protests by Cabindan Catholics. His predecessor, Paulino Fernandes Madeca, was known to be sympathetic to the Cabindan separatist cause.

The Episcopal Conference of Angola and São Tomé (CEAST) decried the opposition of Cabindan Catholics to Vieira Dias's nomination and warned against the politicization of the Church in Cabinda. In Vieira Dias's absence, Eugenio Dal Corso, then the bishop of Saurímo, was sent to Cabinda in July to become apostolic administrator of the diocese. On 18 July, he was beaten while preparing to celebrate mass at the church of the Immaculate Conception and had to be taken to the hospital. Dal Corso responded by shutting the parish and suspending its pastor, Fr. Jorge Casimiro Congo. After local priests, including Cabinda's vicar general Fr. Raul Tati, protested against this move by writing to the Vatican with a request for Dal Corso's resignation, Dal Corso dismissed Tati from his position. Many Cabindan clergy went on strike in solidarity with the suspended priests and refused to celebrate mass. While CEAST stated that it held the priests “completely” responsible for not celebrating mass, Congo responded that no dialogue had been held with the Cabindan clergy and people. Meanwhile, the Front for the Liberation of the Enclave of Cabinda stated that it held CEAST responsible for the confrontation and implied that the bishops' conference was being manipulated by the Angolan government. (Note: Congo and Tati and some followers joined the Catholic Church of the Americas (Igreja Católica das Américas), associated with Bishop Cupertino Teixeira who is in Massachusetts in the U.S., which was still active in 2021.)

Papal nuncio Giovanni Angelo Becciu emphasized that Vieira Dias's nomination was a matter of papal prerogative and would not be revoked. He came to Cabinda in order to meet with Dal Corso, and while he held a “fraternal” meeting with Cabindan priests, his meeting with laypeople was "hostile" and his car was stoned by a crowd.

At the beginning of December 2005, an accord for the resumption of the celebration of masses was reached. By the end of March 2006, CEAST declared that the religious life of the Cabinda diocese was back to normal. Vieira Dias's installation took place on 10 June 2006.

While bishop of Cabinda, Vieira Dias served as coordinator for Benedict XVI's 2009 visit to Angola.

Pope Francis named him a member of the Pontifical Council for Culture on 29 March 2014.

== Archbishop of Luanda ==
On 8 December 2014, Pope Francis appointed Vieira Dias archbishop of Luanda. Local observers disputed the significance of his personal ties to the dos Santos government. He was installed on 24 January 2015. On 9 November 2015, he was elected president of CEAST. He continued as Apostolic Administrator of Cabinda from the time of his assignment to Luanda until the installation of his successor in Cabinda, Belmiro Cuica Chissengueti, on 7 October 2018.

The Angola government was reportedly upset that in October 2019 Pope Francis did not make the 61-year-old Angola native Vieira Dias a cardinal, choosing instead the 80-year-old Italian missionary Eugenio Dal Corso, bishop emeritus of the Angolan dioceses of Saurímo and Benguela.

== See also ==
- Cabinda War
- Catholic Church in Angola
