= Anastácio Cahango =

Angolan Catholic prelete (born 1937)

The Most Reverend Anastácio Cahango
- Auxiliary Bishop Emeritus of Luanda, Angola
- Church: Catholic Church
- Archdiocese: Roman Catholic Archdiocese of Luanda
- See: Luanda
- Appointed: 17 January 1998
- Installed: 3 May 1998

Orders
- Ordination: 3 July 1977 by Cardinal Albino Luciani
- Consecration: 3 May 1998 by Cardinal Alexandre do Nascimento

Personal details
- Born: Anastácio Cahango; 3 June 1937 (age 88); Kamabatela-Ambaca, Cuanza Norte Province, Angola

Styles of Anastácio Cahango
- Reference style: His Eminence
- Spoken style: Your Eminence
- Religious style: Monsignor

Anastácio Cahango (also Anastácio Kahango) O.F.M. Cap., (born 3 June 1937) is an Angolan Catholic prelate who served as Auxiliary Bishop of the Roman Catholic Archdiocese of Luanda from 17 January 1998 until his age-related retirement on 26 October 2013. Pope John Paul II appointed him bishop in 1998. He was consecrated bishop on 3 May 1998. He concurrently served as Titular Bishop of Thignica, while auxiliary bishop. Pope Francis accepted Bishop Cahango's resignation on 26 October 2013, having attained the retirement age for Catholic bishops. He is a member of the Order of Friars Minor Capuchin.

== Background and priesthood ==
He was born on 3 June 1937 at Kamabatela-Ambaca in the Archdiocese of Luanda in Angola. While at seminary, he became a member of the Catholic religious Order of Friars Minor Capuchin. He took his perpetual vows in 1964. He was ordained a priest for the same religious Order on 3 July 1977 by Cardinal Albino Luciani, Patriarch of Venice. He served as priest until 17 January 1998.

== Bishop ==
On 17 January 1998, Pope John Paul II appointed him Auxiliary Bishop of the Archdiocese of Luanda. He was concurrently appointed Titular Bishop of Thignica on the same day. He was concentrated bishop on 3 May 1998 by Cardinal Alexandre do Nascimento, Archbishop of Luanda assisted by Aldo Cavalli, Titular Archbishop of Vibo and Pedro Luís Guido Scarpa, Bishop of Ndalatando.

On 28 October 2013, Pope Francis accepted the age-related resignation from the pastoral care of the Archdiocese of Luanda presented by Anastácio Cahango, O.F.M. Cap., Auxiliary Bishop of that Metropolitan Ecclesiastical Province. While auxiliary bishop, he advocated for peace between the Angolan central government and the separatist from the Cabinda Province.

== See also ==
- Catholic Church in Angola
