= Diocese of Cabinda =

Roman Catholic diocese in Angola

Coordinates: 5.5585°S 12.1921°E

Diocese of Cabinda Dioecesis Cabindana

Location
- Country: Angola
- Headquarters: Rua Gago Coutinho, Largo Pedro Benge, Cabinda, Angola

Statistics
- Area: 7.12 km^{2} (2.75 sq mi)
- Population: Total; Catholics: 762000; 565195 (74.2%)
- Parishes: 21

Information
- Denomination: Catholic
- Sui iuris church: Latin Church
- Rite: Roman
- Established: July 2, 1984; 41 years ago
- Cathedral: Our Lady Queen of the World in Cabinda
- Secular priests: 33

Current leadership
- Bishop: Belmiro Cuica Chissengueti, CSSp
- Suffragan: Archdiocese of Luanda

Map
- Location within Angola

The Roman Catholic Diocese of Cabinda (Latin: Dioecesis Cabindana) is a diocese located in the city of Cabinda in the ecclesiastical province of Luanda in Angola.

== History ==
- 2 July 1984: Established as Diocese of Cabinda from the Metropolitan Archdiocese of Luanda. It comprises the province of Cabinda.

== Special churches ==
The Cathedral of the diocese is the Cathedral church of Our Lady Queen of the World (Portuguese: Sé Catedral de Nossa Senhora Rainha do Mundo) in Cabinda.

== Leadership ==
Bishops of Cabinda (Roman rite)

- Bishop Paulino Fernandes Madeca (2 July 1984 – 11 February 2005)
- Bishop Filomeno do Nascimento Vieira Dias (11 February 2005 – 8 December 2014; apostolic administrator through 7 October 2018), appointed Archbishop of Luanda
- Bishop Belmiro Cuica Chissengueti, C.S.Sp. (3 July 2018–present)

== See also ==
- Roman Catholicism in Angola

== Sources ==
- Cabinda on Catholic-Hierarchy.org
- Cabinda on GCatholic.org
