= Diocese of Mbanza Congo =

Roman Catholic diocese in Angola

Coordinates: 6.2652°S 14.2457°E

Diocese of Mbanza Congo Dioecesis Mbanzacongensis Diocese de Mabanza Congo

Location
- Country: Angola

Statistics
- Area: 39,459 km^{2} (15,235 sq mi)
- Population: Total; Catholics: 875,320; 378,468 (43.2%)
- Parishes: 8

Information
- Denomination: Catholicism
- Sui iuris church: Latin Church
- Rite: Roman
- Established: November 7, 1984
- Archdiocese: Luanda
- Cathedral: Sé Catedral de Nossa Senhora da Conceição
- Secular priests: 16

Current leadership
- Bishop: Vicente Carlos Kiaziku, OFMCap

Map
- Zaire Province, location of M'banza-Kongo, within Angola

The Roman Catholic Diocese of Mbanza Congo (Latin: Dioecesis Mbanzacongensis) is a diocese located in the city of M'Banza Congo in the ecclesiastical province of Luanda in Angola.

== History ==
- 7 November 1984: Established as Diocese of Mbanza Congo from the Diocese of Uíje

== Special churches ==
The Cathedral of the diocese is Sé Catedral de Nossa Senhora da Conceição (Cathedral Church of the Conception of Our Lady) in M'Banza Congo.

== Leadership ==
- Bishops of Mbanza Congo (Roman rite), in reverse chronological order
  - Bishop Vicente Carlos Kiaziku, OFMCap (5 January 2009–present)
  - Bishop Serafim Shyngo-Ya-Hombo, OFMCap (29 May 1992 – 17 July 2008)
  - Bishop Afonso Nteka, OFMCap (8 November 1984 – 10 August 1991)

== See also ==
- Roman Catholicism in Angola

== Sources ==
- GCatholic.org
