= Thignica =

Coordinates: 36°31′25″N 9°21′42″E

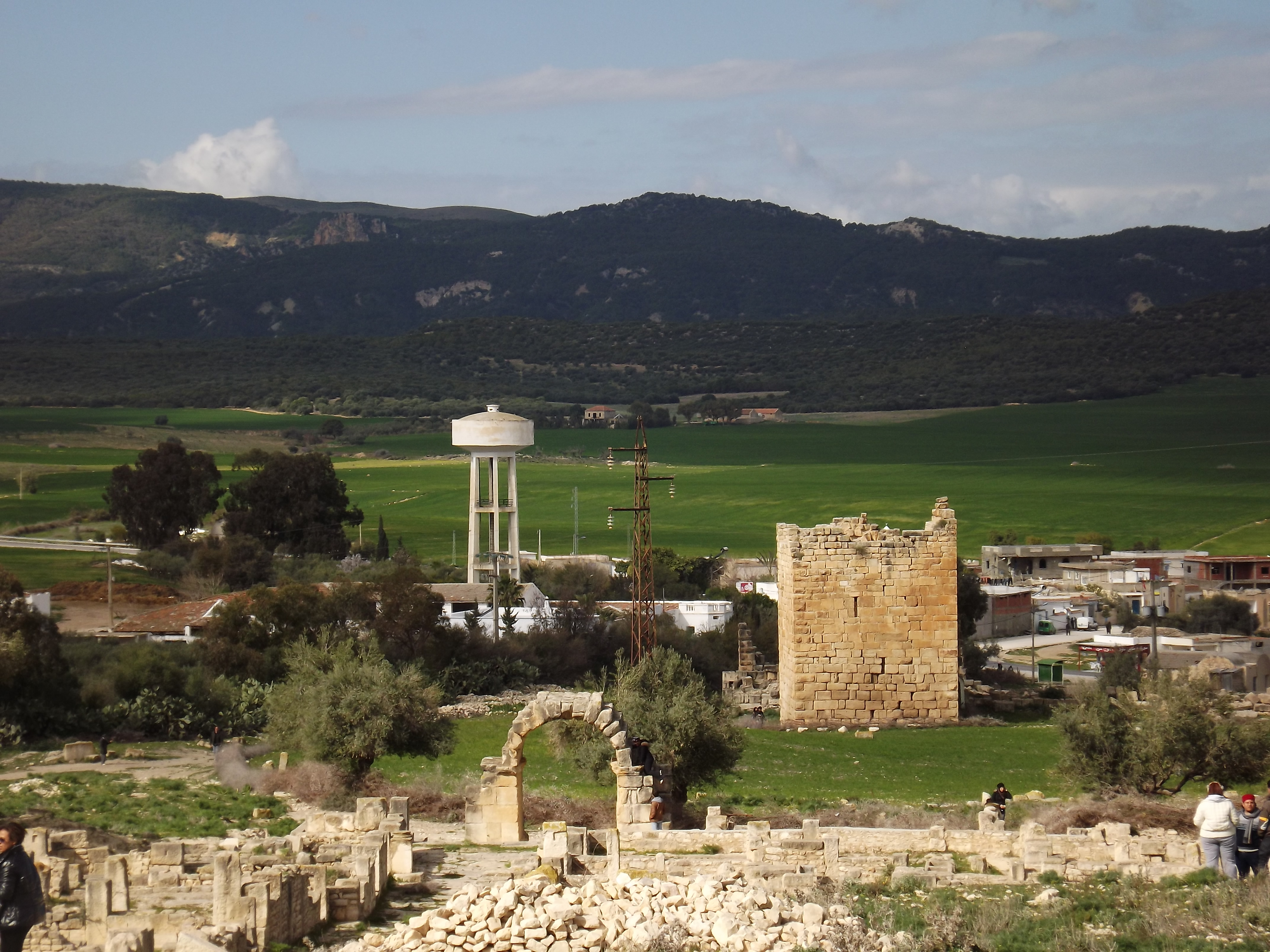
Thignica

Thignica was a town in the Roman province of Africa Proconsularis. It served as a Latin Catholic titular see.

== The town ==
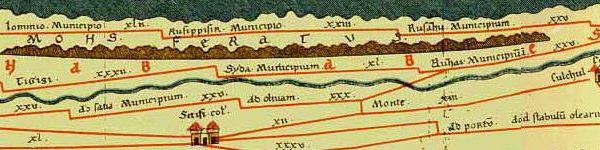
Detail of the Tabula Peutingeriana showing ancient Numidia

Thignica's stone ruins are called Aïn Tounga, located southwest of Testour, Tunisia. They are very extensive and cover the summit and slopes of a series of hills. One inscription calls the town "Civitas Thignicensis" (the city of Thignica) and states that it was divided into three parts, another that it became a municipium at the beginning of the 3rd century under the name of "municipium Septimium Aurelium Antoninianum Herculeum Frugiferum Thignica". Towards the centre of the ruins is a Byzantine fortress, trapezoidal in shape, flanked by five square towers. Here an inscription makes mention of the proconsul Domitius Zenophilus (326-32), famous in the annals of Christian Africa. Among the other ruins are a small triumphal arch, a temple, a Christian church, the remains of the enclosure, etc., as well as an amphitheatre.

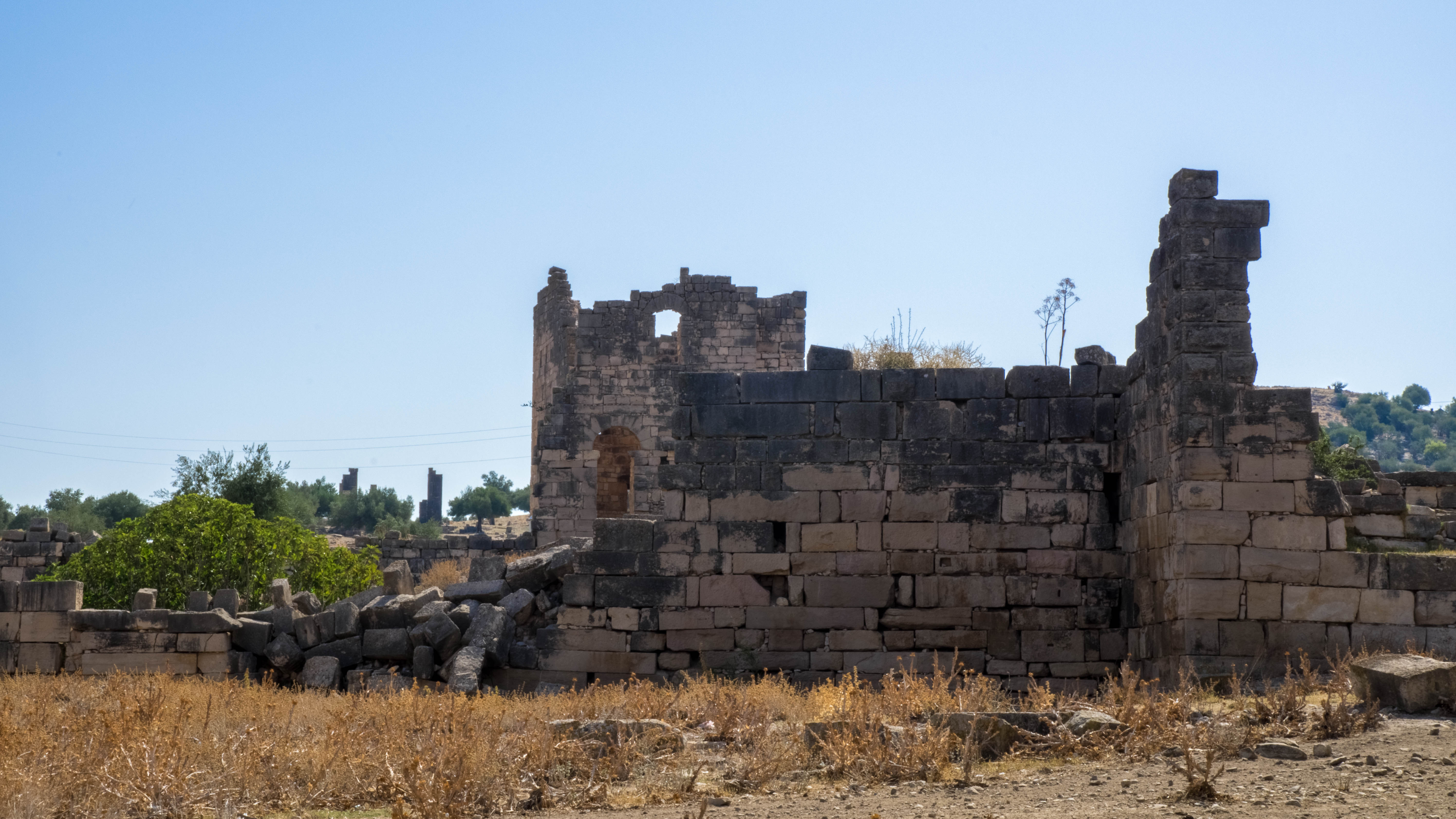
Byzantine fortress

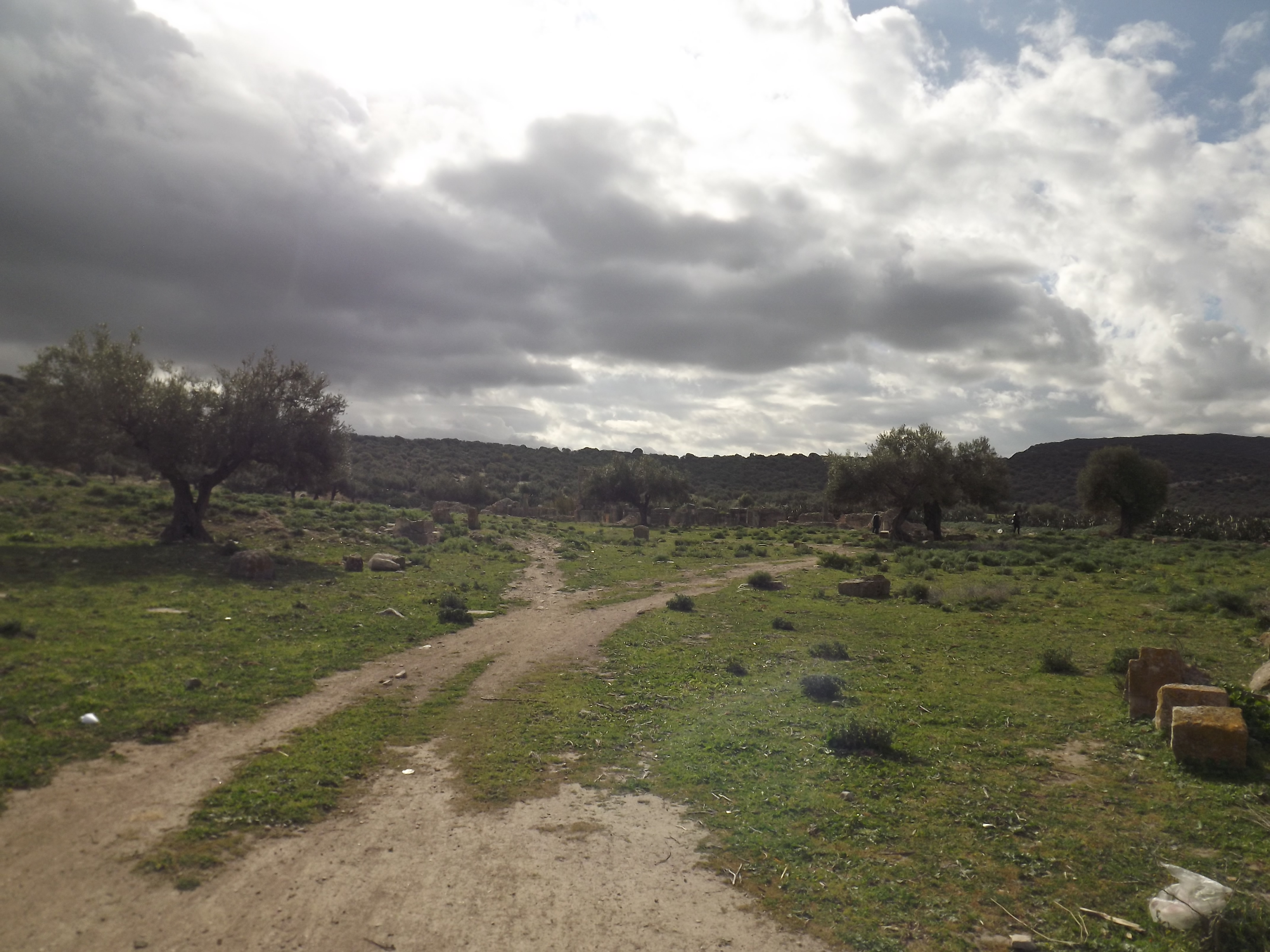
Aïn Tounga

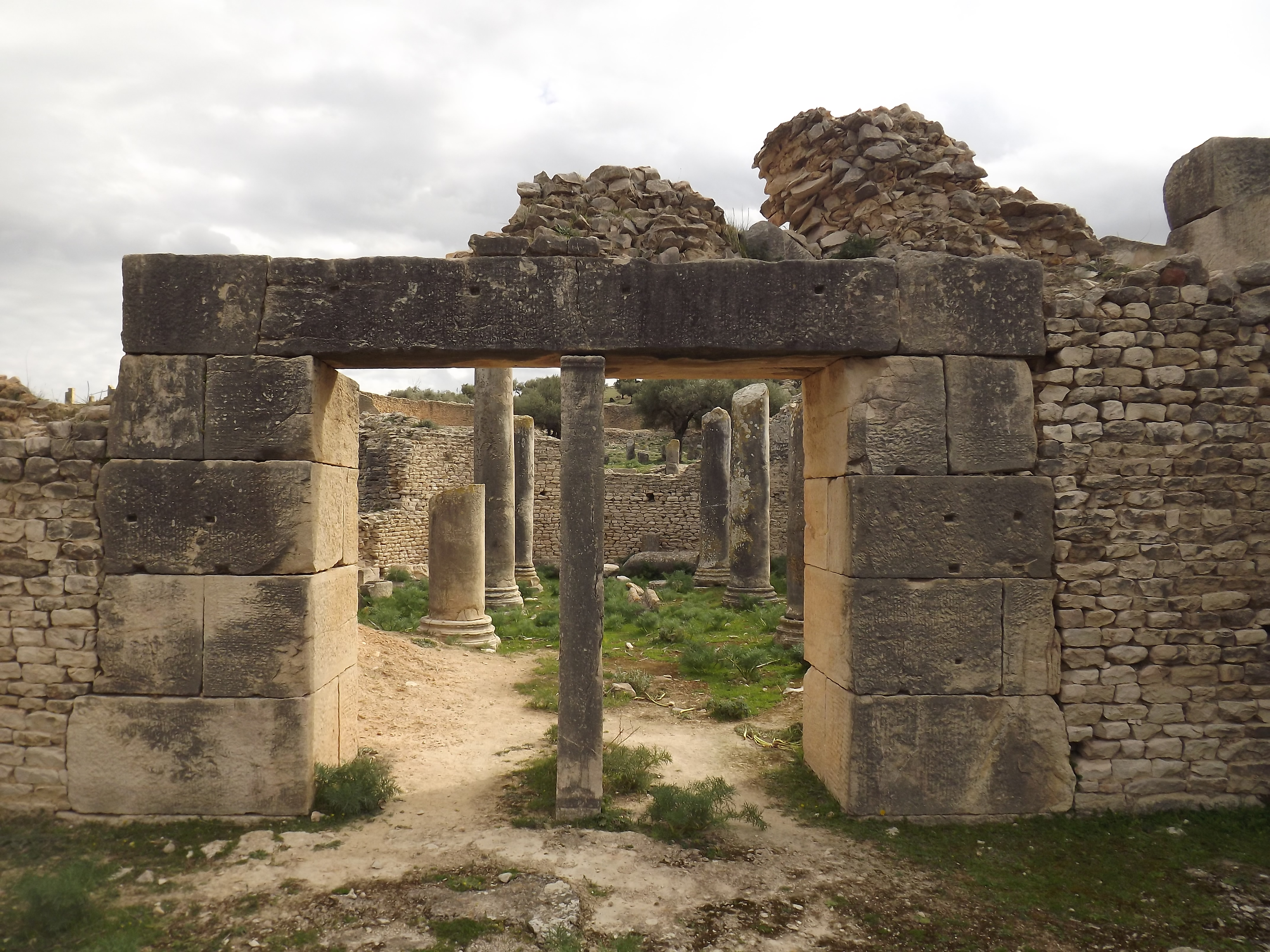
Roman thermae

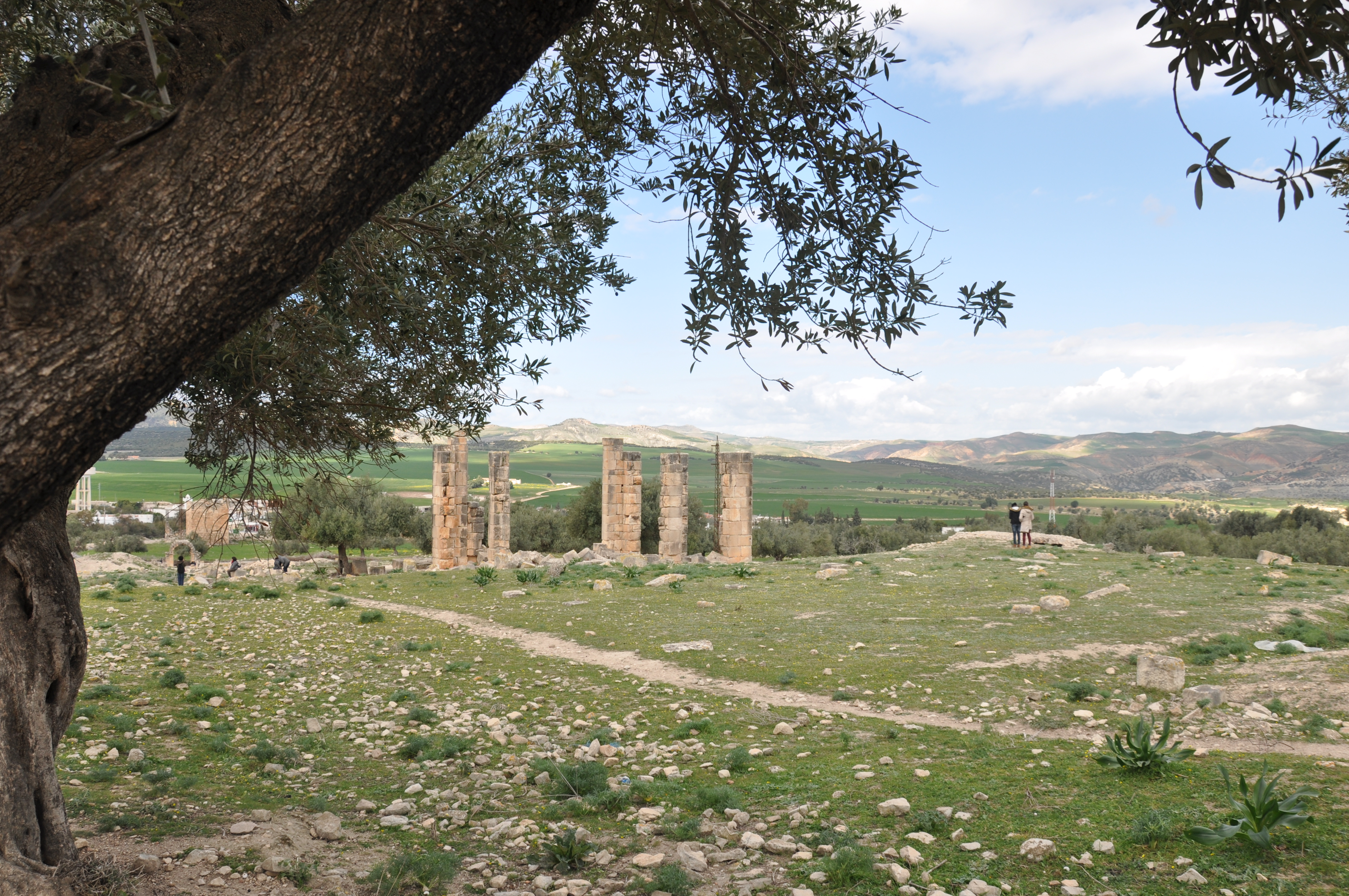
Roman-era temple

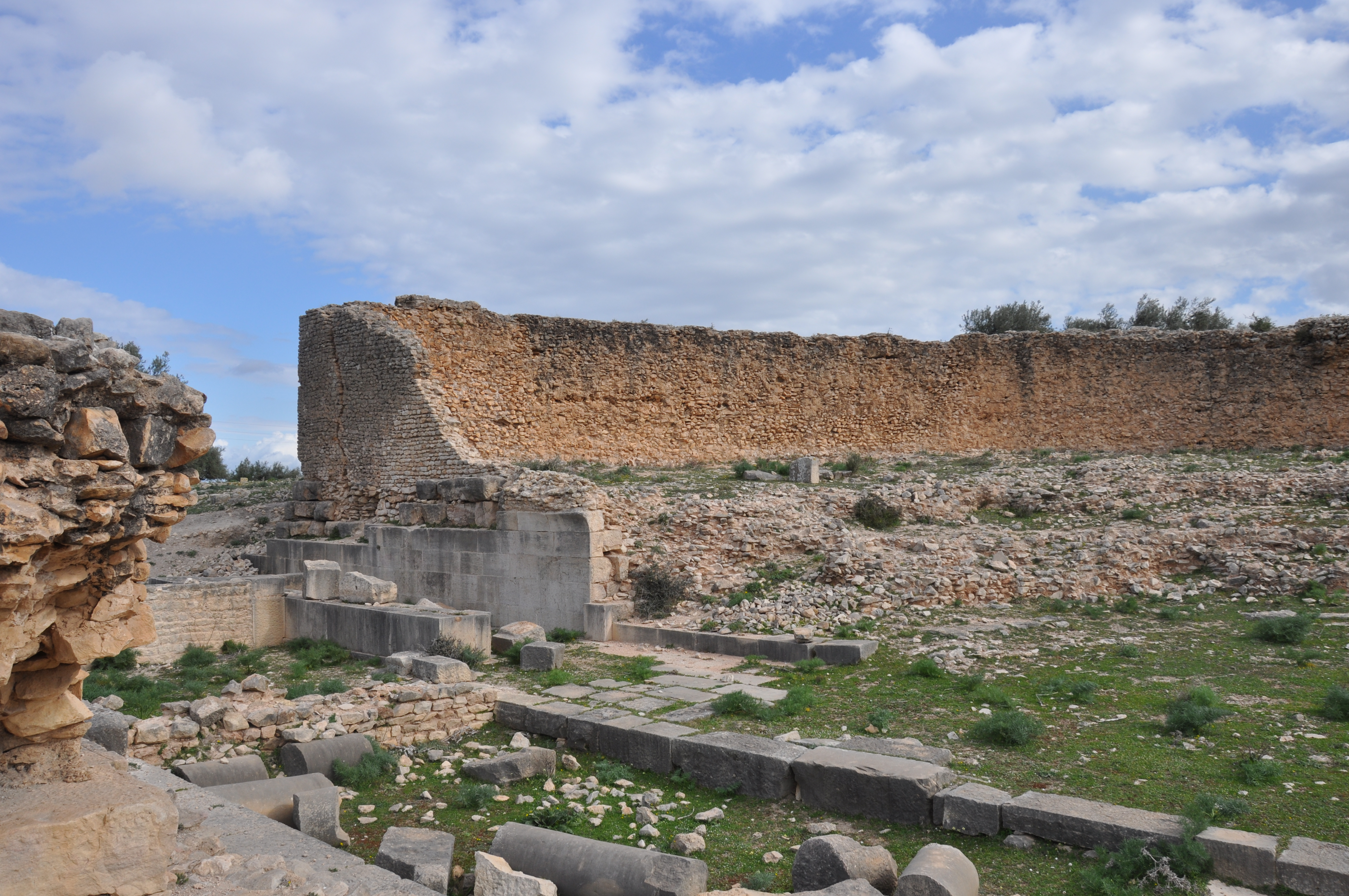
Roman theater

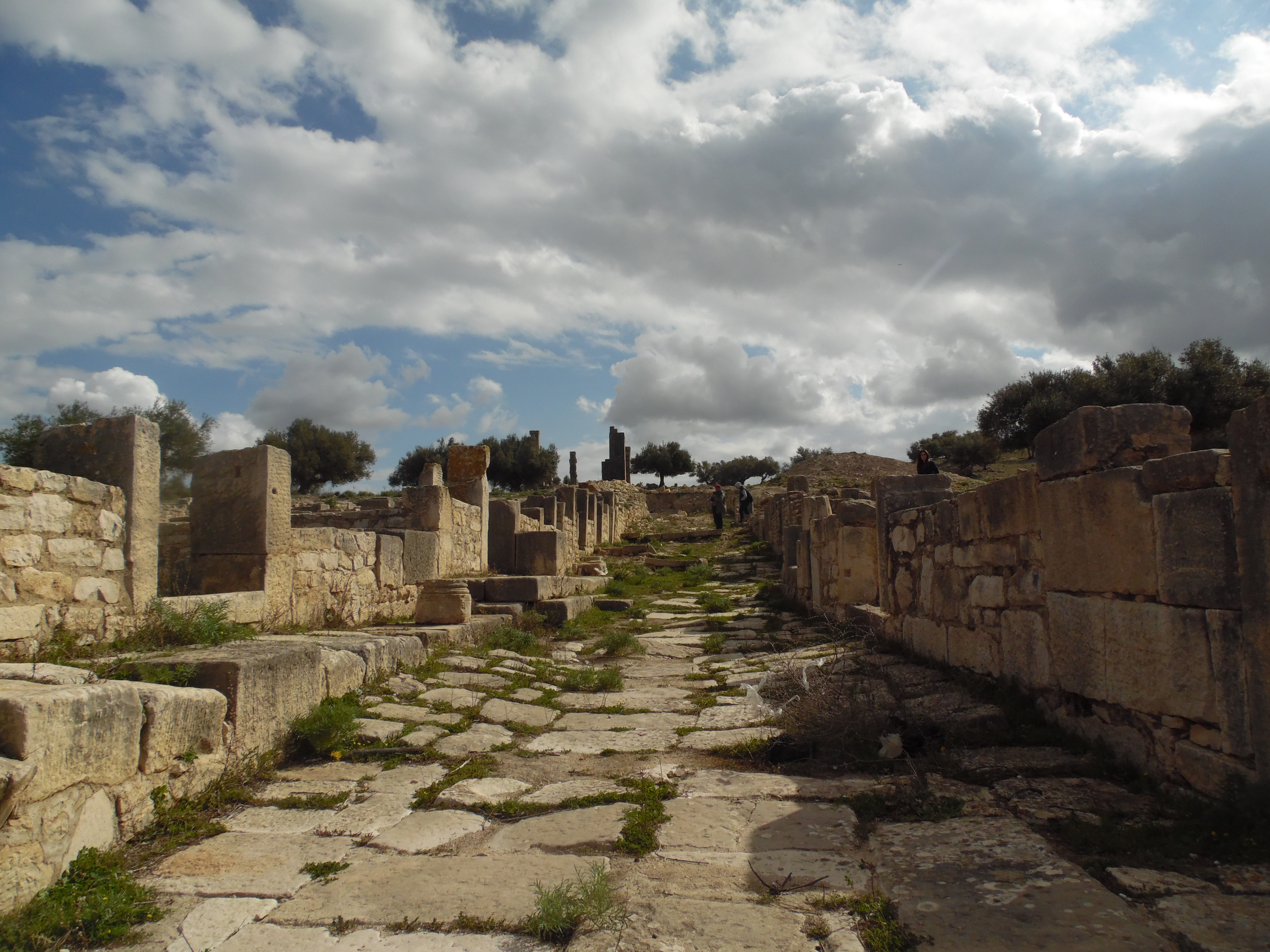
Street in Aïn Tounga

== The bishopric ==
Despite the splendour and importance of this town, we know of only one bishop, Aufidius, who assisted at the Conference of Carthage (411), where he had a Donatist rival.
