= Archdiocese of Luanda =

Roman Catholic archdiocese in Angola

Coordinates: 8.8333°S 13.2333°E

Archdiocese of Luanda Archidiœcesis Luandensis Arquidiocese de Luanda
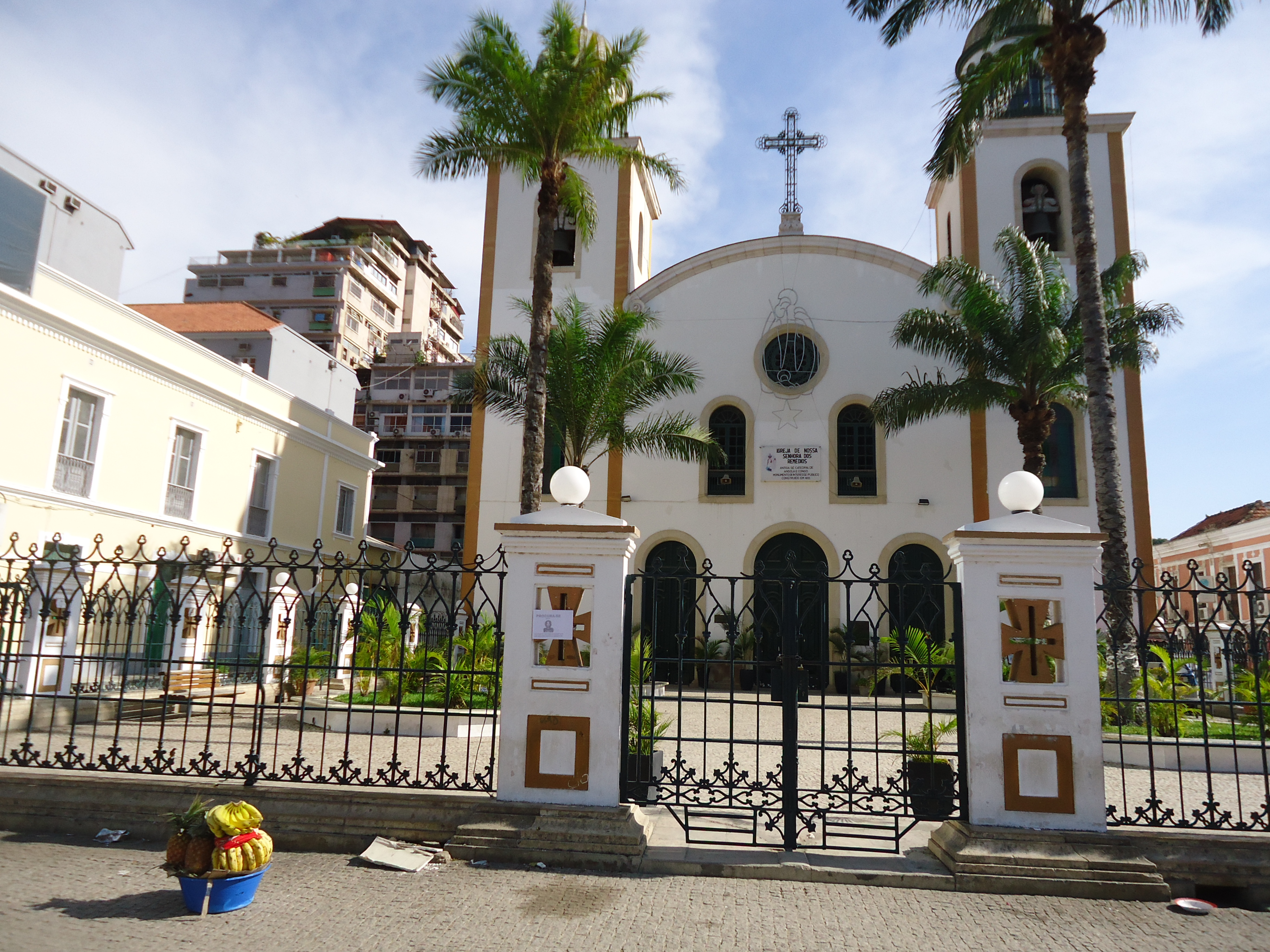
- Cathedral of Luanda

Location
- Country: Angola

Statistics
- Area: 1,074 km^{2} (415 sq mi)

Information
- Denomination: Catholic
- Rite: Roman Rite
- Established: 1596
- Cathedral: Cathedral of Luanda

Current leadership
- Pope: Leo XIV
- Archbishop: Filomeno do Nascimento Vieira Dias
- Auxiliary Bishops: Fernando Francisco; António Lungieki Pedro Bengui
- Bishops emeritus: Anastácio Kahango, OFMCap

The Archdiocese of Luanda (Latin: Archidioecesis Luandensis) is the oldest Roman Catholic archdiocese in Angola.

Its cathedral is the Church of Our Lady of Remedies (Igreja de Nossa Senhora dos Remédios) in Luanda.

== History ==
The diocese was founded in 1596 as the Diocese of Angola e Congo (Angola and Kongo) or São Salvador de Congo, on territory split off from the Roman Catholic Diocese of São Tomé and Príncipe. Its original cathedral was the Cathedral of the Holy Saviour of Congo.

The metropolitan bishop was the Patriarch of Lissabon, from 1676-1844 the Primate of Brazil. In 1716, the episcopal see was relocated from São Salvador to Luanda.

It was elevated to an Archdiocese on 4 September 1940.

Since the death of Archbishop Damião António Franklin, the 21st man to hold that position, on 28 April 2014, the seat is occupied by Filomeno do Nascimento Vieira Dias.

== Statistics ==
As of 2004, the archdiocese was home to approximately 4.84 million people, approximately 3.06 million of them being Roman Catholic (63.1%). There are approximately 150 priests serving the over 3 million Catholics.

== List of bishops and archbishops ==
Bishops of Angola e Congo (1596–1940)

- Miguel Rangel, OFMCap (20 May 1596 Appointed – 16 August 1602 Died)
- Antonio de Santo Estevão, OP (15 July 1604 Appointed – April 1608 Died)
- Manuel Baptista Soares, OFM (4 May 1609 Appointed – April 1620 Died)
- Simon Mascarenhas, OFM (15 February 1621 Appointed – 13 October 1624 Died)
- Francisco de Soveral, OSA (8 February 1627 Appointed – 5 January 1642 Died)
- Pedro Sanches Farinha (22 June 1671 Appointed – 3 November 1671 Died)
- Antonio do Espirito Santo, OCD (14 November 1672 Appointed – 12 January 1674 Died)
- Manuel da Natividade, OFM (2 December 1675 Appointed – 8 December 1685 Died)
- João Franco de Oliveira (9 June 1687 Appointed – 9 January 1692 Appointed, Archbishop of São Salvador da Bahia)
- José de Oliveira, OSA (19 July 1694 Appointed – 9 September 1700 Resigned)
- Luis Simões Brandão (6 February 1702 Appointed – 24 February 1720 Resigned)
- Manuel a Santa Catharina, OCarm (20 March 1720 Appointed – 1 November 1731 Died)
- Antônio de Nossa Senhora do Desterro Malheiro, OSB (3 September 1738 Appointed – 15 December 1745 Appointed, Bishop of São Sebastião do Rio de Janeiro)
- Manoel de Santa Ines Ferreira, OCD (15 December 1745 Appointed – 6 August 1770 Appointed, Archbishop of São Salvador da Bahia)
- Luis da Anunciação Azevedo, OP (17 June 1771 Appointed – 8 November 1784 Resigned)
- Alexandre da Sagrada Familia Ferreira da Silva, OFM (14 February 1785 Appointed – 23 November 1787 Resigned)
- Luiz de Brito Homem (17 December 1791 Appointed – 24 May 1802 Confirmed, Bishop of São Luís do Maranhão)
- Joaquim Maria Mascarenhas Castello Branco (20 December 1802 Confirmed – April 1807 Resigned)
- João Damasceno Da Silva Póvoas (19 December 1814 Confirmed – 21 February 1826 Died)
- Sebastião da Anunciação Gomes de Lemos, OCD (16 April 1846 Confirmed – 1848 Resigned)
- Joaquim Moreira Reis, OSB (28 September 1849 Confirmed – 10 March 1857 Resigned)
- Manuel de Santa Rita Barros, TOR (23 March 1860 Confirmed – 3 January 1862 Died)
- José Lino de Oliveira (21 December 1863 Appointed – 1 July 1871 Resigned)
- Tommaso Gomes de Almeida (4 August 1871 Appointed – 22 September 1879 Appointed, Auxiliary Bishop of Goa)
- José Sebastião d’Almeida Neto, OFM (22 September 1879 Confirmed – 9 August 1883 Confirmed, Patriarch of Lisbon)
- Antonio Tomas da Silva Leitão e Castro (27 March 1884 Appointed – 1 June 1891 Appointed, Coadjutor Bishop of Lamego)
- Antonio Dias Ferreira (1 June 1891 Appointed – 7 March 1901 Resigned)
- Antonio José Gomes Cardoso (23 July 1901 Appointed – 12 August 1904 Died)
- Antonio Barbosa Leão (2 May 1906 Confirmed – 19 December 1907 Appointed, Bishop of Faro {Algarve})
- João Evangelista de Lima Vidal (29 April 1909 Confirmed – 9 December 1915 Appointed, Auxiliary Bishop of Lisboa {Lisbon})
- Moisés Alves de Pinho, CSSp (7 April 1932 Appointed – 4 September 1940)

Archbishops of Luanda (since 1940)

- Moisés Alves de Pinho, CSSp (4 September 1940 – 17 November 1966 Retired)
  - Manuel Nunes Gabriel, Coadjutor Archbishop (13 February 1962 – 17 November 1966)
- Manuel Nunes Gabriel (17 November 1966 Succeeded – 19 December 1975 Resigned)
  - Eduardo André Muaca, Coadjutor Archbishop (10 August – 19 December 1975)
- Eduardo André Muaca (19 December 1975 Succeeded – 31 August 1985 Resigned)
- Alexandre do Nascimento (16 February 1986 Appointed – 23 January 2001 Retired)
- Damião António Franklin (23 January 2001 Appointed – 28 April 2014 Died)
- Filomeno do Nascimento Vieira Dias (8 December 2014 Appointed – present)

=== Auxiliary bishops ===
- Eduardo André Muaca † (1970–1973), appointed Bishop of Malanje
- Zacarias Kamwenho (1974–1975), appointed Bishop of Novo Redondo
- Paulino Fernandes Madeca † (1983–1984), appointed Bishop of Cabinda
- Pedro Luís Guido Scarpa, OFMCap † (1983–1990), appointed Bishop of Ndalatando
- Serafim Shyngo-Ya-Hombo, OFMCap (1990–1992), appointed Bishop of Mbanza Congo
- Damião António Franklin † (1992–2001), appointed Archbishop here
- Anastácio Kahango, OFMCap (1998–2013)
- Filomeno do Nascimento Vieira Dias (2003–2005), appointed Bishop of Cabinda
- Zeferino Zeca Martins, SVD (2012–2018), appointed Archbishop of Huambo
- António Lungieki Pedro Bengui (2021–present)
  - Also, Apostolic Administrator of the Roman Catholic Diocese of São Tomé and Príncipe (13 July 2022 – present)
- Fernando Francisco (2021 – present)

== Suffragan dioceses ==
- Diocese of Cabinda
- Diocese of Caxito
- Diocese of Mbanza Congo
- Diocese of Sumbe
- Diocese of Viana
