= 1980s in Angola =

Angola-related events during the 1980s

In the 1980s in Angola, fighting spread outward from the southeast, where most of the fighting had taken place in the 1970s, as the African National Congress (ANC) and SWAPO increased their activity. The South African government responded by sending troops back into Angola, intervening in the Angolan Civil War for much of the decade. Throughout the 1980s, the Angolan Civil War was a central proxy Cold War conflict with the Soviet Union aiding the MPLA government and the United States supporting UNITA, an anti-communist resistance movement.

The Soviet Union delivered massive amounts of military aid to the Angolan government from 1981 to 1986. In 1984 alone, the Soviet Union provided the Angolan government with over US$2 billion in military and other aid. In 1981, newly-elected U.S. president Ronald Reagan's U.S. assistant secretary of state for African affairs, Chester Crocker, developed a linkage policy, tying Namibian independence to Cuban withdrawal and peace in Angola.

== South African attacks ==
On May 12, 1980, the South African Defence Force (SADF) attacked the MPLA in Cunene Province. The Angolan Ministry of Defense accused the South African government of wounding and killing civilians. Nine days later, the SADF attacked in Cuando-Cubango Province, and the MPLA threatened to respond militarily. The SADF launched a full-scale invasion of Angola through Cunene and Cuando-Cubango on June 7, destroying SWAPO's operational command headquarters on June 13, in what Prime Minister Botha described as a "shock attack". The Angolan government arrested 120 Angolans who were planning to set off explosives in Luanda, on June 24, foiling a plot purportedly orchestrated by the South African government. Three days later, the United Nations Security Council convened at the behest of Angola's ambassador to the UN, E. de Figuerido, and condemned South Africa's incursions into Angola. President Mobutu of Zaire also sided with the MPLA. The Angolan government recorded 529 instances in which South African forces violated Angola's territorial sovereignty between January and June 1980.

Cuba increased its 35,000-strong troop force in Angola from 35,000 in 1982 to 40,000 in 1985. South African forces tried to capture Lubango, capital of Huíla province, in Operation Askari in December 1983.

== Democratic International ==
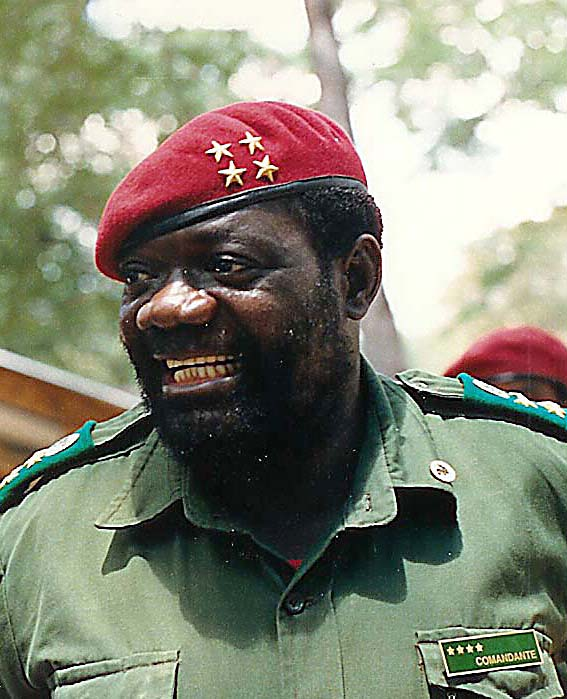
U.S.-supported UNITA leader Jonas Savimbi

On June 2, 1985, American conservative activists held the Democratic International, a symbolic meeting of anti-Communist militants, at UNITA's headquarters in Jamba, Angola. Primarily funded by Rite Aid founder Lewis Lehrman and organized by anti-Communist activists Jack Abramoff and Jack Wheeler, participants included Savimbi, Adolfo Calero, leader of the Nicaraguan Contras, Pa Kao Her, Hmong Laotian rebel leader, U.S. Lieutenant Colonel Oliver North, South African security forces, Abdurrahim Wardak, Afghan Mujahideen leader, Jack Wheeler, American conservative policy advocate, and many others. While the Reagan administration, though unwilling to publicly support the meeting, privately expressed approval. The governments of Israel and South Africa supported the idea, but both respective countries were deemed inadvisable for hosting the conference.

The participants released a communiqué stating,

"We, free peoples fighting for our national independence and human rights, assembled at Jamba, declare our solidarity with all freedom movements in the world and state our commitment to cooperate to liberate our nations from the Soviet Imperialists."

== Clark Amendment ==
The United States House of Representatives voted 236 to 185 to repeal the Clark Amendment on July 11, 1985. The Angolan government began attacking UNITA later that month from Luena towards Cazombo along the Benguela Railway, taking Cazombo on September 18. The government tried unsuccessfully to take UNITA's supply depot in Mavinga from Menongue. While the attack failed, very different interpretations of the attack emerged. UNITA claimed Portuguese-speaking Soviet officers led government troops while the government said UNITA relied on South African paratroopers to defeat the government. The South African government admitted to fighting in the area, but said its troops fought SWAPO militants.

== War intensifies ==
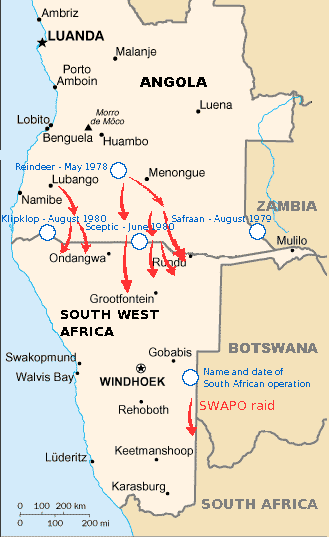
The operations of SWAPO and South African Defence Forces between 1978 and 1980

By 1986, Angola began assuming a central role in the Cold War. The Soviet Union, Cuba, and other Eastern bloc nations enhanced support for the MPLA government, and American conservatives began escalating their support for Savimbi's UNITA as part of the Reagan Doctrine. Savimbi developed close relations with influential American conservatives, who saw Savimbi as a key ally in the U.S. effort to oppose and rollback Soviet-backed, non-democratic governments around the world. The conflict quickly escalated, with both Washington and Moscow seeing it as a critical strategic conflict in the Cold War.

The Soviet Union gave an additional $1 billion in aid to the Angolan government and Cuba sent an additional 2,000 troops to the 35,000 strong force in Angola to protect Chevron oil platforms in 1986. Savimbi had called Chevron's presence in Angola, already protected by Cuban troops, a "target" for UNITA in an interview with Foreign Policy magazine on January 31.

In Washington, Savimbi forged close relationships with influential conservatives, including Michael Johns (The Heritage Foundation's foreign policy analyst and a key Savimbi advocate), Grover Norquist (Americans for Tax Reform president and a Savimbi economic advisor), and others, who played critical roles in elevating escalated U.S. covert aide to Savimbi's UNITA and visited with Savimbi in his Jamba headquarters to provide the Angolan rebel leader with military, political and other guidance in his war against the Angolan government. With enhanced U.S. support, the war quickly escalated, both in terms of the intensity of the conflict and also in its perception as a key conflict in the overall Cold War.

On February 1, 1987, The New York Times reported that U.S. weapons shipments to UNITA were escalating considerably. "According to the sources," The New York Times reported, "the light blue cargo planes of Santa Lucia Airways made arms deliveries on three occasions: between March 20 and April 20, for two weeks between May 15 and 30, and during one night in mid-October. Most of the landings were at night, but in May 'it was day and night -quite some activity,' one source said."

In addition to escalating its military support for UNITA, the Reagan administration and its conservative allies also worked to expand recognition of Savimbi as a key U.S. ally in an important Cold War struggle. In January 1986, Reagan invited Savimbi to meet with him at the White House. Following the meeting, Reagan spoke of UNITA winning a victory that "electrifies the world" at the White House in January 1986. Two months later, Reagan announced the delivery of Stinger surface-to-air missiles as part of the $25 million in aid UNITA received from the U.S. government. Jeremias Chitunda, UNITA's representative to the U.S., became the Vice President of UNITA in August 1986 at the sixth party congress. Fidel Castro made Crocker's proposal, the withdrawal of foreign troops from Angola and Namibia, a prerequisite to Cuban withdrawal from Angola on September 10.

UNITA forces attacked Camabatela in Cuanza Norte province on February 8, 1986. ANGOP alleged UNITA massacred civilians in Damba in Uíge Province later that month, on February 26. The South African government agreed to Crocker's terms in principle on March 8. Savimbi proposed a truce regarding the Benguela railway on March 26, saying MPLA trains could pass through as long as an international inspection group monitored trains to prevent their use for counter-insurgency activity. The government did not respond. In April 1987 Fidel Castro sent Cuba's Fiftieth Brigade to southern Angola, increasing the number of Cuban troops by twelve to fifteen thousand troops. The Angolan and American governments began negotiating in June 1987.

=== Cuito Cuanavale and New York City ===
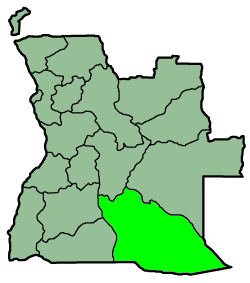
A map of Angola with Cuando Cubango Province highlighted

UNITA and South African forces attacked the MPLA's base at Cuito Cuanavale in Cuando Cubango province from January 13 to March 23, [1988], in the second largest battle in the history of Africa, after the Battle of El Alamein, the largest in sub-Saharan Africa since World War II. Cuito Cuanavale's importance came not from its size or its wealth but its location. The ensuing Battle of Cuito Cuanavale has since been disputed with both sides claiming victory.

The Cuban government joined negotiations on January 28, 1988, and all three parties held a round of negotiations on March 9. The South African government joined negotiations on May 3 and the parties met in June and August in New York City and Geneva. All parties agreed to a ceasefire on August 8. Representatives from the governments of Angola, Cuba, and South Africa signed the Tripartite Accord, granting independence to Namibia and ending the direct involvement of foreign troops in the civil war, in New York City, United States on December 22, 1988. The United Nations Security Council passed Resolution 626 later that day, creating the United Nations Angola Verification Mission, a UN peacekeeping force. UNAVEM troops began arriving in Angola in January 1989.

== Ceasefire ==
As the Angolan Civil War began to take on a diplomatic component, in addition to a military one, two key Savimbi allies, The Conservative Caucus' Howard Phillips and the Heritage Foundation's Michael Johns visited Savimbi in Angola, where they sought to persuade Savimbi to come to the United States in the spring of 1989 to help the Conservative Caucus, the Heritage Foundation and other conservatives in making the case for continued U.S. aid to UNITA.

President Mobutu invited eighteen African leaders, Savimbi, and dos Santos to his palace in Gbadolite in June 1989 for negotiations. Savimbi and dos Santos met for the first time and agreed to the Gbadolite Declaration, a ceasefire, on June 22, paving the way for a future peace agreement. President Kenneth Kaunda of Zambia said a few days after the declaration that Savimbi had agreed to leave Angola and go into exile, a claim Mobutu, Savimbi, and the U.S. government disputed. Dos Santos agreed with Kaunda's interpretation of the negotiations, saying Savimbi had agreed to temporarily leave the country.

On August 23, dos Santos complained that the U.S. and South African governments continued to fund UNITA, warning such activity endangered the already fragile ceasefire. The next day Savimbi announced UNITA would no longer abide by the ceasefire, citing Kaunda's insistence that Savimbi leave the country and UNITA disband. The government responded to Savimbi's statement by moving troops from Cuito Cuanavale, under government control, to UNITA-occupied Mavinga. The ceasefire broke down with dos Santos and the U.S. government blaming each other for the resumption in armed conflict.
