= Cuando Cubango Province =

Province of Angola

Coordinates: 16°5′S 19°30′E

Cuando Cubango
- Province
- Cuando Cubango Province, Angola
- Country: Angola
- Capital: Menongue

Area
  - Total: 199,049 km^{2} (76,853 sq mi)

Population (2014 census)
  - Total: 534,002
  - Density: 2.68277/km^{2} (6.94833/sq mi)
- ISO 3166 code: AO-CCU
- HDI (2018): 0.498 low · 16th
- Website: www.kuandokubango.gov.ao

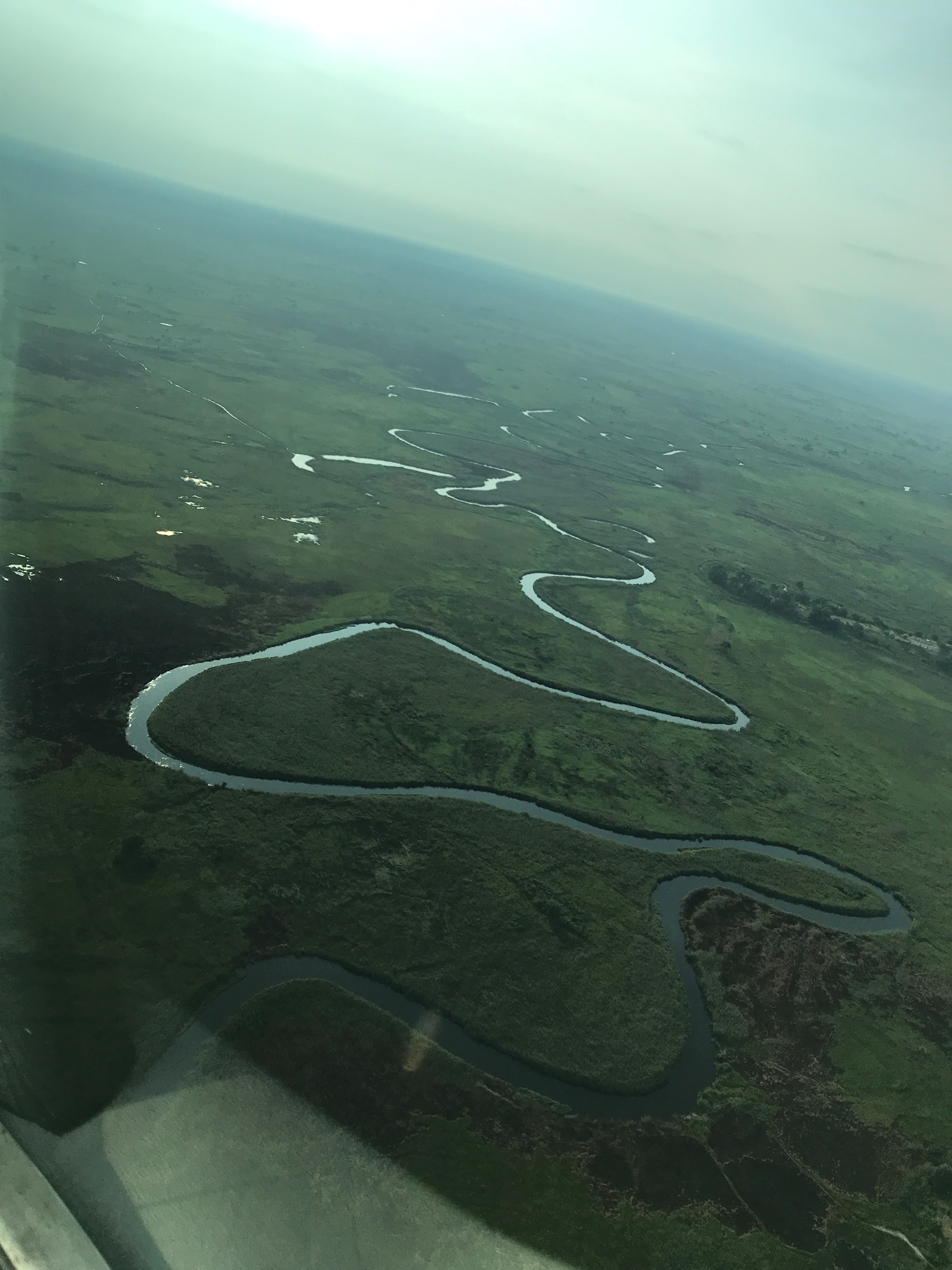
An aerial view of Cuando Cubango Province in March 2019

Cuando Cubango (Umbundu: Kwando Kubango Volupale) was a former province of Angola. It was divided into the provinces of Cuando and Cubango in 2024.

Cuando Cubango had an area of 199,049km^{2} and a population of 534,002 in 2014. Menongue was the capital of the province.

The name of the province derives from that of the Cuando and Cubango rivers, which flow through the eastern and western edges of the province, respectively.

== History ==
Throughout much of the 1980s and 1990s, Cuando Cubango served as the location for the primary base camp of Angola's UNITA rebel movement, led by Jonas Savimbi. The rebel movement received support from the United States as part of the Cold War conflict against Angola's Marxist government, which was supported by the Soviet Union, Cuba and other communist states.

Savimbi and UNITA maintained a large and clandestine base camp in the Cubando Cubango town of Jamba. The camp was protected by anti-aircraft weapons and included an air strip, which was used for the delivery of military and other supplies, which typically arrived from neighboring Zaire. The Angolan Civil War ultimately became one of the most prominent conflicts of the Cold War, with both the United States and the Soviet Union depicting its outcome as important to the global balance of power.

== Geography ==
Cuando Cubango was traversed by the northwesterly line of equal latitude and longitude. It was located in the extreme southeast of Angola. To the north and northeast it bordered Moxico Province, and in the west, the provinces of Huila and Cunene. In the south of Cuando Cubango it bordered Namibia, and to the east, Zambia.

== Municipalities ==
The province of Cuando Cubango contained nine municipalities (Portuguese: municípios):

- Calai
- Cuangar
- Cuchi
- Cuito Cuanavale
- Dirico
- Mavinga
- Menongue
- Nancova
- Rivungo

== Communes ==
The province of Cuando Cubango contained the following communes (Portuguese: comunas), sorted by their respective municipalities:

- Calai Municipality – Calai, Maué, Mavengue
- Cuangar Municipality – Caila (Bondo), Cuangar, Savate
- Cuchi Municipality – Chinguanja, Cuchi, Cutato (Kutato), Vissati
- Cuito Cuanavale Municipality – Baixo Longa, Cuito Cuanavale, Longa, Lupire (Lupiri)
- Dirico Municipality – Dirico, Mucusso, Xamavera
- Mavinga Municipality – Cunjamba Dima, Cutuile (Kutuile), Luengue, Mavinga
- Menongue Municipality – Caiundo (Kaiundo), Cueio-Betre, Menongue, Missombo
- Nancova Municipality – Nancova, Rito
- Rivungo Municipality – Chipundo, Jamba-Cueio, Luiana, Mainha Neriquinha, Rivungo

== Natural history ==
Considerable natural habitat previously existed within the province, although much of these areas has been destroyed during the period 1965 to 1991 during the foreign intervention years of the Angolan Civil War. In particular, the area was previously suitable habitat for the endangered painted hunting dog, Lycaon pictus, which is now deemed extirpated in the local area.

== List of governors of Cuando Cubango ==
Name	Years in office
Mariano Garcia Puku	1976–1979
Zacarias Pinto	1979–1982
Manuel Francisco Tuta Batalha de Angola	1982–1990
Domingos Hungo SKS	1990–1995
Manuel Dala	1995–1998
José Kativa	1998–1999
Jorge Fernando Biwango	1999–2002
João Baptista Chindandi	2003–2008
Eusébio de Brito Teixeira	2008–2012
Francisco Higino Lopes Carneiro	2012–2016
Pedro Mutindi	2017–2019
Júlio Marcelino Vieira Bessa	2019–2021
José Martins	2021–2024

Up to 1991, the official name was Provincial Commissioner
