= 1985 Aeroflot Antonov An-12 shootdown =

Aircraft shoot-down in Angola

1985 Soviet Air Force Antonov An-12 shoot-down
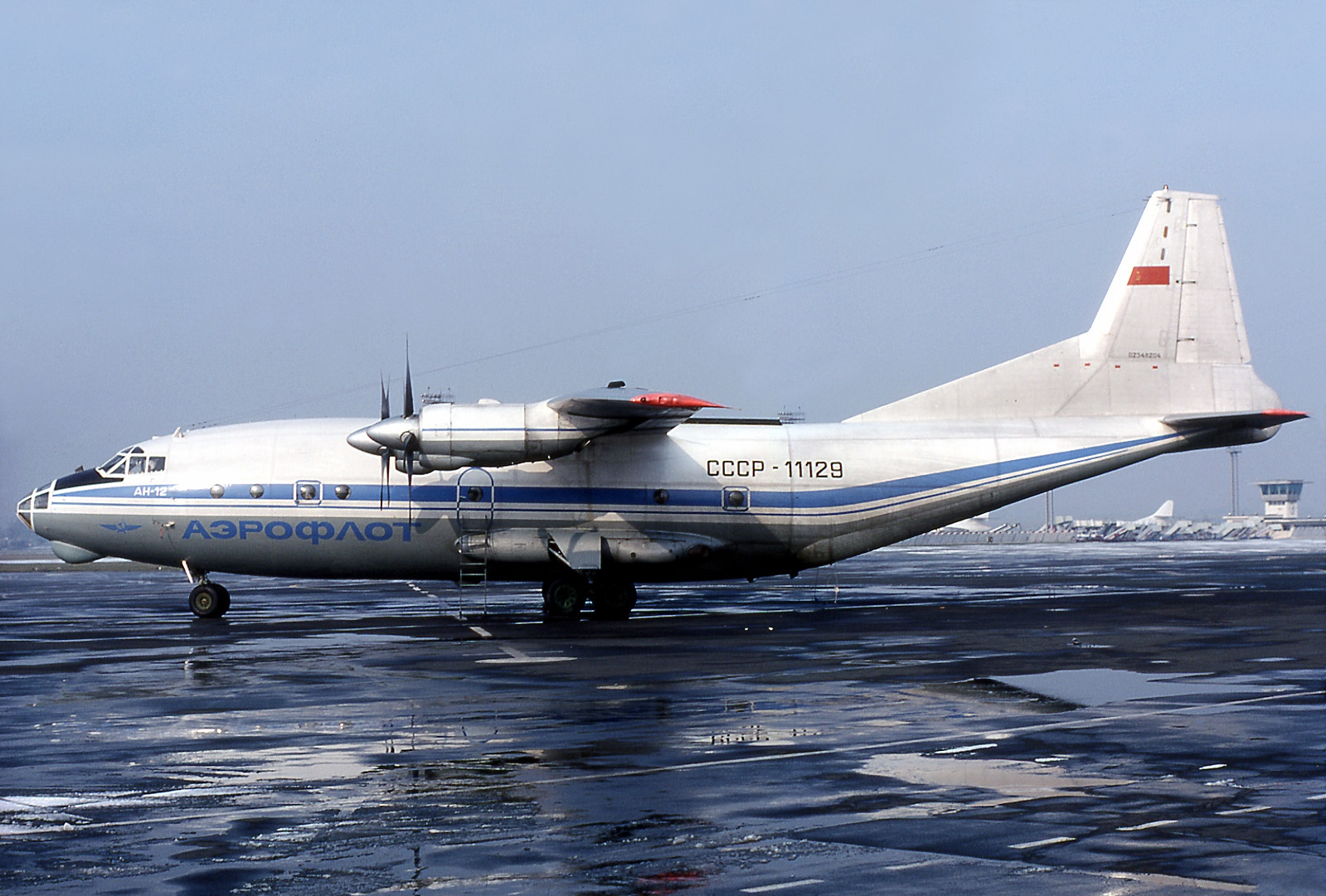
- An Aeroflot Antonov An-12 similar to CCCP-11747.

Shootdown
- Date: 25 November 1985
- Summary: In-flight break up following shootdown
- Site: Approx. 43 km east of Menongue, Cuando Cubango Province, Angola; 14.711403°S 18.125237°E

Aircraft
- Aircraft type: Antonov An-12BP
- Operator: Soviet Air Force
- Registration: CCCP-11747 (Note: The aircraft registration prefix for civil aircraft registered in the Soviet Union was SSSR. In the Russian cyrillic alphabet, the English letter "S" is written as "C" and "R" is written as "P", hence "CCCP" is "SSSR" in cyrillic.)
- Flight origin: Cuito Cuanavale Airport, Cuito Cuanavale, Angola
- Destination: Luanda International Airport, Luanda, Angola
- Passengers: 15
- Crew: 8
- Fatalities: 23
- Survivors: 0

The 1985 Soviet Air Force Antonov An-12 shoot down occurred on November 25, 1985, in Angola during the Angolan Civil War and South African Border War. An Aeroflot Antonov An-12BP cargo aircraft operated by the Soviet Air Force flying from Cuito Cuanavale to Luanda was shot down, allegedly by South African Special Forces, and crashed approximately 43 kilometres (27 mi) east of Menongue in Angola's Cuando Cubango province.

The incident took place in the aftermath of the Soviet Union-backed People's Armed Forces of Liberation of Angola's (FAPLA) operation 2 Congresso do Partido conducted against units of the National Union for the Total Independence of Angola (UNITA, which received support from South Africa).

The transport was carrying eight crew members, 15 passengers and two tank diesel engines in need of repairs. According to eyewitnesses from the local populace and investigative reports, the aircraft was shot down by a surface-to-air missile (SAM). All people on board the aircraft died in the crash.

== Flight overview ==
The aircraft involved in the incident was an Antonov An-12BP, a large Soviet-built four-engine turboprop transport, tail registration CCCP-11747. Officially a civil aircraft, it was part of an air transportation military detachment consisting of several An-12 transports and their crews, under the direct command of the Soviet Chief Military Advisor in Angola. The detachment was part of the 369th Military Transport Aviation Regiment, 7th Military Transport Aviation Division, Military Transport Aviation, based at that time in the city of Jankoi/Dzhankoy, Crimea, Ukrainian SSR. The An-12s were primarily used to support FAPLA and its military operations. All eight crew members and four of the passengers were Soviet nationals. Nine other passengers were Angolans.

The flight crew consisted of:

- Captain: Sergei Vasilievich Lukyanov
- First Officer: Alexei Nikolaevich Nikitin
- Flight Engineer: Viktor Viktorovich Osadchuk
- Navigator: Vladimir Borisovich Zhurkin
- Flight Operator: Sergei Nikolaevich Grishenkov
- Flight Interpreter: Vladimir Alekseevich Shibanov
- Flight Technician: Vitaly Vladimirovich Pshenyuk
- Flight Interpreter Trainee: Sergei Nikolaevich Sholmov

== Crash ==
According to eyewitness reports and the black box recordings, the An-12BP took off from Cuito Cuanavale at 11:20 am. About 15 minutes into the flight at the altitude of approximately 10,000 feet (3,000 m) the pilot reported an explosion to air traffic control on the aircraft's port side next to the wing and engines. Seconds later the pilot also reported that the transport was experiencing problems with engines three and four and stated his intention to turn towards Menongue airport, located less than 50 kilometres (31 mi) away, for an emergency landing. After the explosion, the cargo of two massive tank engines became loose and shifted, altering the aircraft's center of gravity and causing it to bank to the port side. The black box recordings indicated that the crew tried to level the An-12 and turn it towards Menongue's airport for an emergency landing; however, 47 seconds after the missile detonated, the port wing exploded and separated from the aircraft. The burning aircraft then crashed in a field about 43 kilometres (27 mi) away from Menongue, with the main part of the widespread wreckage landing in close proximity to the Menongue-Cuito Cuanavale road. The next day, several officers from the Soviet Military Mission in Menongue, accompanied by Cuban and Angolan troops, arrived at the crash site where they found all 21 bodies – 8 crew members and 13 passengers – at the scene. The human remains were first transported to Menongue for identification and later to Luanda. Coffins containing the remains of the Soviet crew and passengers were then transported to the Soviet Union.

=== Shootdown ===
Civilians from local villages and members of the local people's defense organization (ODP – Organização de Defesa Popular), who had witnessed the midair explosion and the crash, said they had heard and seen what they believed to be a surface-to-air missile being launched immediately before the accident. They described the sound and fume trails that originated from the ground to the point of impact in midair. The recordings of the An-12BP crew's air traffic conversation with Menongue air-defense radar operators were obtained by Angolan authorities. These were later passed on to Soviet investigators conducting their own probe into the crash. The recordings revealed that the crew had reported a missile explosion on the aircraft's port side. In the Soviet Union a specially designated commission under the direct supervision of the Chief of the Air Military Transportation Command of the Soviet Armed Forces was created to establish the cause of the crash. The commission's examination of parts of the aircraft's fuselage revealed multiple traces of an explosive matter and fragments from the surface-to-air missile.

In his book Journey Without Boundaries, SADF Colonel André Diedericks, a former South African Special Forces officer, claims that he was the person who gave the order to launch the missile that brought down the An-12. During the early summer of 1985 one of the previously captured Strela-l (SA-9) systems, manned and operated by a South African Recce group under the command of then-Captain Diedericks, crossed into the Cuando Cubango province, Angola, and with UNITA's help, protection and escort was secretly deployed around the Menongue area. The main mission of the group was to carry out covert combat operations, code names "Catamaran 1" and "Catamaran 2", with the goal of disrupting air traffic in Cuando Cubango province by shooting down both Cuban and Angolan transports, combat aircraft and gunships with the Strela-l (SA-9).

Diedericks' account is reiterated by Koos Stadler, another Reconnaissance Regiment soldier (colloquially known as the "Recces") in his 2015 book, RECCE: Small Team Missions Behind Enemy Lines .

== Casualties ==
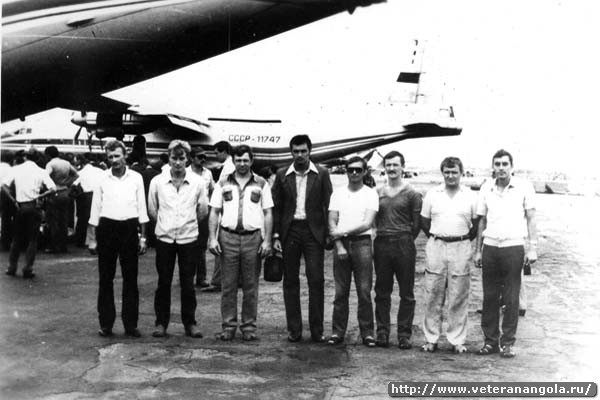
Crew of CCCP-11747

All 21 air force crew and military passengers were killed in the crash:

- Five Soviet Air Force officers
- Two Soviet Air Force warrant officers
- A Soviet Military Institute of Foreign Languages translator
- Four Soviet Army officers
- Nine FAPLA officers

In 1987, a commemorative monument, featuring images of the An-12BP's crew members and their names, was erected in the city of Dzhankoy, where most of them were stationed and had lived.

== Reactions and aftermath ==
In the 12 hours after the crash, the after-midnight news reports issued by the BBC, the Voice of America African Service and UNITA's radio station Galo Negro made almost identical announcements: UNITA was reported as having shot down a Cuban military cargo aircraft with Cuban personnel on board, in the same area that the An-12BP was shot down, using a surface-to-air missile. The next day, on November 26, 1985, UNITA officially claimed responsibility for shooting down the aircraft. However, several months later information obtained through various intelligence sources indicated that the An-12 was brought down by a missile launched from a Soviet-made 9K31 Strela-1, a vehicle-mounted short-range guided surface-to-air missile system. Several Strela-1s had been captured by the South African Defence Force (SADF) during a prior incursion into Angola.

In the aftermath of the crash, on December 5, 1985, a Mil Mi-8 helicopter was shot down. Two Mi-8 crews were tasked to provide close air support to a Cuban-reinforced infantry battalion that had orders to secure the crash area for the arrival of a team to conduct on-site investigation and help remove the wreckage for further investigation. As the battalion approached the area of the crash, it was ambushed by a far superior combined SADF/UNITA force deployed along the Menongue-Cuito Cuanavale road. A fierce fight ensued, resulting in a high number of dead and wounded from both sides. The two Mi-8s, both manned by Soviet Air Force crews, were called in to provide support for the Cuban battalion. On their arrival they came under heavy anti-aircraft ground fire. One was shot down; it crashed and burst into flames, killing the Soviet crew. There were also two Angolan soldiers from the newly formed 29th Airborne Assault Brigade, manning door-mounted guns on the helicopter, who also died in the crash.
