= Operation Southern Cross =

- Part of the Angolan Civil War and South African Border War
- Location: Angola Operation Southern Cross (Angola)
- Objective: Artillery Bombardment of Cuito Cuanavale
- Date: July 1986
- Outcome: South African victory: Successful artillery bombardment by South African forces

Operation Southern Cross (1986) was a military operation by the South African Defence Force during the South African Border War and Angolan Civil War.

== Background ==
During May 1986, the South African Defence Force (SADF) began planning an operation that called for the capture of the People's Armed Forces for the Liberation of Angola (FAPLA) controlled town and airbase at Cuito Cuanavale. The units would consist of 32 Battalion, South African Air Force, Special Forces and National Union for the Total Independence of Angola (UNITA) troops. The operation would be carried out at night and aided by air and artillery attacks. Cuito Cuanavale was a military base used previously to launch Cuban and Angolan attacks on the UNITA held town of Mavinga with the objective to capture it and eventually launch an attack on the UNITA headquarters at Jamba. The 13th and 25th FAPLA Brigades were deployed to protect Cuito Cuanavale.

This initial plan was scrapped by the SADF and modified to become just an artillery bombardment on Cuito Cuanavale. This occurred during July 1986. The SADF would use the Valkiri multiple rocket launchers and the G5 155 mm artillery guns. 32 Battalion would be used for escort and protection duties. The town was bombarded for two nights and failed to achieve its destruction.

The original assault plan was then revived and this became the planning tool for Operation Alpha Centauri during August 1986.
