= Cunjamba =

- Commune
- Location in Angola
- Coordinates: 15.37°S 20.14°E
- Country: Angola
- Province: Cuando
- Municipality: Dima
- Time zone: UTC+1 (WAT)
- Climate: Aw

Cunjamba is a commune in the municipality of Dima in Cuando Province in southeast Angola. It was established in the 2024 reform of Angolan administrative divisions, and roughly corresponds in extent to the former commune of Cunjamba-Dima in the municipality of Mavinga in Cuando Cubango Province, which was disestablished under the same law. As of 2014, the former commune had a population of 1,064 people over an area of 6,220 square kilometres (2,400 sq mi).
