= Mucusso =

Coordinates: 18.023°S 21.4279°E

- Municipality
- Location in Angola
- Country: Angola
- Province: Cuando
- Time zone: UTC+1 (WAT)
- Climate: BSh

Mucusso is a municipality in Cuando Province, Angola. Prior to the administrative division reforms of 2024, it was a commune in the municipality of Dirico in the province of Cuando Cubango. It is located less than 15 km (9.3 mi) from the border with the Caprivi Strip of Namibia. As of 2014, the commune had a population of 3,602 people over an area of 5,910 square kilometres (2,280 sq mi).

== See also ==
- Mucusso National Park
