= Cueio =

Cueio Jamba-Cueio
- Commune
- Location in Angola
- Coordinates: 15°30′S 17°58′E
- Country: Angola
- Province: Cuando Cubango
- Time zone: UTC+1 (WAT)
- Climate: Aw

Cueio or Jamba-Cueio is a commune in Angola, located in the municipality of Caiundo, Cubango Province. Prior to Angola's 2024 administrative reforms, it was located in the municipality of Menongue in the province of Cuando Cubango. The commune of Jamba-Cueio had a population of 4,247 spread over 6,420 square kilometres (2,480 sq mi) in 2014.
