= Cutato, Cubango =

Cutato
- Municipality
- Location in Angola
- Coordinates: 14.37°S 16.49°E
- Country: Angola
- Province: Cubango
- Time zone: UTC+1 (WAT)
- Climate: Aw

Cutato is a municipality of Angola located in the province of Cubango. It is subdivided into the communes of Cutato and Vissati. Before the Angolan administrative reforms of 2024, it was a commune in the municipality of Cuchi in the province of Cuando Cubango.
