= Chinguanja =

- Municipality
- Location in Angola
- Coordinates: 15°03′S 16°57′E
- Country: Angola
- Province: Cubango
- Time zone: UTC+1 (WAT)
- Climate: Aw

Chinguanja is a municipality in Angola's Cubango Province. Prior to Angola's 2024 administrative reforms, it was a commune in the municipality of Cuchi in the province of Cuando Cubango. As of 2014, the city had a population of 3,612 people over an area of 4,010 square kilometres (1,550 sq mi).
