= Baixo Longa =

- Commune
- Location in Angola
- Coordinates: 15°41′S 18°40′E
- Country: Angola
- Province: Cubango
- Time zone: UTC+1 (WAT)
- Climate: Aw

Baixo Longa is a commune of Angola, located in the municipality of Longa in the Angolan province of Cubango. Prior to Angola's administrative reforms in 2024, it was part of the municipality of Cuito Cuanavale in the province of Cuando Cubango.
