= Vissati =

Commune in Angola

- Commune
- Location in Angola
- Coordinates: 14°15′S 16°55′E
- Country: Angola
- Province: Cubango
- Municipality: Cutato

Area
  - Total: 910 km^{2} (350 sq mi)

Population
  - Total: 3,971
- Time zone: WAT

Vissati is a commune in Cubango Province in Angola. Since the Angolan administrative reforms of 2024, it has been part of the municipality of Cutato. Previously it was part of the municipality of Cuchi in the province of Cuando Cubango. As of 2014, the commune had a population of 3,971 people over an area of 910 square kilometres (350 sq mi).
