= Caiundo =

- Municipality
- Location in Angola
- Coordinates: 15°42′S 17°28′E
- Country: Angola
- Province: Cubango
- Time zone: UTC+1 (WAT)
- Climate: Aw

Caiundo is a municipality of Angola, located in the province of Cubango. It contains the communes of Caiundo and Jamba-Cueio. Prior to Angola's 2024 administrative reforms, Caiundo was a commune in the municipality of Menongue in Cuando Cubango Province. As of 2014, the commune had a population of 14,665 people over an area of 6,050 square kilometres (2,340 sq mi).
