= Bondo, Angola =

Bondo
- Former commune
- Country: Angola
- Province: Cuando Cubango
- Municipality: Cuangar
- Time zone: UTC+1 (WAT)
- Climate: Aw

Bondo is a former commune of Angola, located in the province of Cuando Cubango. Since the Angolan administrative reforms of 2024, its territory has been divided between the municipalities of Cuangar and Savate.
