= Xipundo =

Xipundo Chipundo
- Municipality
- Location in Angola
- Coordinates: 16°45′S 22°00′E
- Country: Angola
- Province: Cuando
- Time zone: UTC+1 (WAT)
- Climate: Aw

Xipundo is a municipality in Cuando Province in southeast Angola. Prior to the reform of Angolan administrative divisions in 2024, it was a commune, spelled Chipundo, in the municipality of Rivungo in the province of Cuando Cubango. As of 2014, the commune had a population of 8,598 people over an area of 7,600 square kilometres (2,900 sq mi).
