= Missombo =

Coordinates: 14°48′S 17°41′E

- Former commune
- Location in Angola
- Country: Angola
- Province: Cuando Cubango
- Municipality: Menongue
- Time zone: UTC+1 (WAT)
- Climate: Aw

Missombo is a former commune of Angola, located in the municipality of Menongue in the province of Cuando Cubango. As of 2014, the commune had a population of 9,469 over an area of 3,030 square kilometres (1,170 sq mi). It was disestablished in Angola's 2024 administrative reforms.
