= Cutuile =

- Commune
- Location in Angola
- Coordinates: 15°14′S 20°54′E
- Country: Angola
- Province: Cuando
- Municipality: Dima
- Time zone: UTC+1 (WAT)
- Climate: Aw

Cutuile is a commune in the municipality of Dima in Cuando Province in southeast Angola. Before the 2024 reform of Angolan administrative divisions, it was a commune in the municipality of Mavinga in the province of Cuando Cubango. As of 2014, the commune had a population of 2,334 people over an area of 6,470 square kilometres (2,500 sq mi).
