= Calai =

- Municipality
- Location in Angola
- Coordinates: 17°53′S 19°56′E
- Country: Angola
- Province: Cubango

Population (2014 Census)
  - Municipality: 22,654
  - Urban: 8,741
- Time zone: UTC+1 (WAT)
- Climate: BSh

Calai is a town and municipality in Cubango Province in Angola.

The municipality has an area of 7,900 square kilometres (3,100 sq mi) and a population of 22,654 (2014). It is bordered to the north by the municipality of Mavengue, to the east by the municipality of Dirico, to the south by the Republic of Namibia, and to the west by the municipality of Cuangar. The municipality of Calai was previously constituted by the communes of Calai, Maué and Mavengue, but as of Angola's 2024 administrative reforms, the communes of Maué and Mavengue have been incorporated into the new municipality of Mavengue, and Calai no longer has any subordinate communes.
