= Longa, Angola =

Longa
- Municipality
- Location in Angola
- Coordinates: 14°36′S 18°29′E
- Country: Angola
- Province: Cubango
- Time zone: UTC+1 (WAT)
- Climate: Cwa

Longa is a municipality in Angola's Cubango Province. It contains two communes, Longa and Baixo Longa. Prior to Angola's 2024 administrative reforms, it was a commune in the municipality of Cuito Cuanavale in the province of Cuando Cubango. As of 2014, the commune had a population of 15,104 people over an area of 14,000 square kilometres (5,400 sq mi).
