= Gilder Boathouse =

General information
- Location: 280 Roosevelt Drive, Derby, Connecticut
- Opened: October 21, 2000
- Cost: $7.5 Million
- Owner: Yale University

Technical details
- Floor area: 22,000 square feet (2,000 m^{2})

Design and construction
- Architect: Turner Brooks Architects

Gilder Boathouse is the main facility for the sport of rowing at Yale University. It is located on the bank of Lake Housatonic in Derby, Connecticut along Connecticut Route 34. It is a 22,000 square feet (2,000 m^{2}) facility. It lies at the finish line of Yale's 2,000-meter race course.

It was designed by Turner Brooks Architects of New Haven, which was selected in 1998 in a design competition. It was opened in October 2000.

Costing $7.5 million overall, it was funded in part by Olympic rower Virginia Gilder (Yale '79) and her father Richard Gilder (Yale '54).

A wide stairway and a boat ramp across the riverside front of the building descend to the large (.25 acres (1,000 m^{2})) dock area.
