= International Freedom Foundation =

American apartheid front group

The International Freedom Foundation (IFF) was a self-described anti-communist group established in Washington, D.C. founded in 1986 by former lobbyist Jack Abramoff. Its purported aim was to promote individual and collective freedoms worldwide: freedom of thought; free speech; free association; free enterprise; and, the free market principle. It came into being after the Democratic International, a 1985 meeting of anti-Communist rebels held at the headquarters of UNITA in Jamba, Angola. The IFF campaigned against regimes and movements it described as Soviet allies. To achieve its aim the IFF, with offices in London and Johannesburg, sponsored symposia with high-profile speakers such as Henry Kissinger. Among its eight periodicals, the IFF published a monthly newsletter—the Freedom Bulletin—with three editions: International; UK/Europe; and, Republic of South Africa. The IFF ceased its activities in 1993.

== Funding ==
According to a Newsday article entitled "Front for Apartheid: Washington-based think-tank said to be part of ruse to prolong power" of July 16, 1995, the IFF was alleged to have been funded by apartheid South Africa in the amount of $1.5 million per year from 1986. In return for this funding, South Africa was said to have used the IFF as an instrument to portray the African National Congress (ANC) together with its leaders, Oliver Tambo and the imprisoned Nelson Mandela, as terrorists and as sympathetic to Soviet communism. Code-named Operation Babushka, the IFF succeeded in recruiting a large number of Republican politicians and conservative intellectuals to influence US policies towards the apartheid regime, and to counteract growing domestic and international pressure for the imposition of economic sanctions against South Africa.

The IFF's first chairman was Duncan Sellars. Its Washington lobbyist/film producer, Jack Abramoff, was said by Newsday to have recruited willing—but perhaps unwitting—Republican politicians including: Senator Jesse Helms; Rep. Dan Burton; Rep. Philip Crane; Rep. Robert Dornan; and Alan Keyes. None of these five politicians—and neither Sellars nor Abramoff—admitted to being aware of any South African funding. Had they known that they were effectively working to further the interests of a foreign government, they would have been required under US law to register as a foreign agent with the Justice Department. In apparent support of the politicians' denial, a former member of SA's Directorate of Military Intelligence, Major Craig Williamson, told Newsday that Operation Babushka was designed so that the people it recruited would be unaware of the foreign funding—they would simply be reinforcing their own principled views on South Africa and the ANC. But, in relation to Jack Abramoff—who produced a South African-funded movie Red Scorpion in South-West Africa (now Namibia) in 1988—Williamson indicated that Abramoff would undoubtedly have known about the source of the IFF's funding. Another former SA intelligence official, Colonel Vic McPherson, declared to Newsday how pleased he was with the performance of the IFF: "They were not just good in intelligence, but in political warfare." In 1992, under pressure from Nelson Mandela, funding for the IFF was withdrawn by President F. W. de Klerk and it closed down the following year.

Vic McPherson and Craig Williamson spoke to Newsday before the Promotion of National Unity and Reconciliation Act became law on July 26, 1995, and therefore before South Africa's Truth and Reconciliation Commission (TRC) began its case hearings in April 1996. McPherson and Williamson (along with seven others) applied for and were eventually granted TRC amnesty in 1999 for participating in the bombing in March 1982 of the ANC offices in London.

== London UK office ==
The IFF (UK) published an occasional Freedom Bulletin. The January 1989 edition (no.5, 8 pages) was devoted exclusively to opposing the Reagan-Gorbachev Intermediate-range Nuclear Forces (INF) agreement, which had been signed at the Washington Summit in December 1987. They called for its abandonment and stated that from a Western angle it was appeasement.

The director of the IFF's London office, at 10 Storey's Gate, Westminster, was Marc Gordon (born 1966). On January 31, 1989, in a BBC Radio 4 interview, Gordon praised Western Goals (UK) for its activities in "exposing left-wing political activities of charities", such as Oxfam and Christian Aid. The IFF strenuously opposed the June 1989 visit to London of Dr. Andries Treurnicht of the Conservative Party (South Africa), organised by the Western Goals Institute. Gordon stated that the IFF was against apartheid. Gordon was publicly disowned by the UK Conservative Party after he claimed to have gone on a patrol with anti-communist Contra rebels in Nicaragua and was photographed holding an assault rifle.

On August 1, 1989, during the debate about whether or not the Hong Kong Chinese should be given British passports, Gordon stated that "as regards Hong Kong, the IFF believes human labour should not be subject to restrictions on its movement". By September 25, 1992, Gordon was railing against the Western Goals Institute, and urged the Conservative Party to expel WGI members, a move which the London Evening Standard described as "doubtless assisted by his South African paymasters". In response, WGI's Gregory Lauder-Frost wrote to the Jewish Chronicle on 25 September 1992 stating that "the Conservative Party has always been a broad church. However, Marc Gordon's I.F.F.'s support for the importing to our overcrowded island of 3,000,000 Hong Kong Chinese would not, I believe, endear him to the vast majority of grass-roots conservatives."

Without revealing his political past, Gordon got a post with Sir James Goldsmith's Referendum Party, where he was helping to choose candidates in 1996. It emerged that Gordon had been vice-chairman of the West Midlands Federation of Conservative Students before it was controversially banned by the then Tory Chairman, Norman Tebbit, in 1987, for "its extremist views".
