= Luengué Hunting Reserve =

The Luengué Hunting Reserve (also known as Luengue Hunting Area) is located in Luengué, Mavinga, Cuando Cubango, Angola. Established on July 15, 1959, it is 16,700 km^{2} (6,400 sq mi).
