= Cuangar =

- Municipality
- Location in Angola
- Coordinates: 17°36′S 18°37′E
- Country: Angola
- Province: Cubango

Population (2014 Census)
  - Total: 28,459
- Time zone: UTC+1 (WAT)
- Climate: BSh

Cuangar is a municipality of the province of Cubango in Angola.

It covers 18,917 km^{2} and has about 22,000 inhabitants. It is situated on the Cubango which forms part of Angola's southern border to Namibia; the border crossing leads across the river to Nkurenkuru, the administrative centre of Kavango West. Cuangar is bounded to the north by the municipality of Nancova, to the northeast by the municipality of Mavengue, to the east by the municipality of Calai, and to the west by the municipality of Savate.

Prior to Angola's 2024 administrative reforms, the municipality was subdivided into the communes of Cuangar, Savate and Bondo. In 2024, Savate was made a separate municipality, and the territory of Bondo divided between Cuangar and Savate.

The name of the municipality derives from the name of a subgroup of the Ovambos, the Cuangares, who live in the area.

== History ==
On 31 October 1914, the Germans under the command of Oswald Ostermann retaliated, and raided the Portuguese fort at Cuangar, destroying the fort and killing all stationed border guards with machine-guns. This was later referred to as the "Cuangar Massacre".
