= Mazimbo =

Mazimbo may refer to:

- Mazimbo, Tanzania, a place in the Mbeya Region, Tanzania
- Mazimbo (stream), a stream in the Cuando Cubango Province, Angola
