= Luiana =

Coordinates: 17°23′S 23°00′E

- Municipality
- Location in Angola
- Country: Angola
- Province: Cuando
- Time zone: UTC+1 (WAT)
- Climate: Aw

Luiana is a municipality in Cuando Province in southeast Angola. Prior to the 2024 reform of administrative divisions in Angola, it was a commune in the municipality of Rivungo in the province of Cuando Cubango. The commune had a population of 8,010 people in a 12,700 square kilometres (4,900 sq mi) area as of 2014.
