= Dirico Airport =

Airport in Cuando, Angola

- IATA: DRC; ICAO: none

Summary
- Airport type: Public
- Serves: Dirico
- Location: Angola
- Elevation AMSL: 3,504 ft / 1,068 m
- Coordinates: 17°58′55″S 20°46′05″E

Map
- Location of Dirico Airport in Angola

Runways
Direction	Length		Surface
Direction	m	ft	Surface
11/29	1,700	5,577	Grass
- Source: GCM Landings.com Google Maps

Dirico Airport (ICAO: DRC) is an airport near Dirico, a town in Cuando Province, Angola.

== See also ==
- List of airports in Angola
- Transport in Angola
