= Luengue =

Coordinates: 11°32′S 14°16′E

- Municipality
- Location in Angola
- Country: Angola
- Province: Cuando
- Time zone: UTC+1 (WAT)
- Climate: Aw

Luengue is a municipality in Cuando Province in southeast Angola. Prior to the 2024 reform of administrative divisions in Angola, it was a commune in the municipality of Mavinga in the province of Cuando Cubango. As of 2014, the city had a population of 3,457 people over an area of 18,900 square kilometres (7,300 sq mi).

== See also ==
- Luengué Hunting Reserve
