= Maue (surname) =

Maue is a surname. Notable people with the surname include:

- Michael Maue (born 1960), German cyclist
- Paul Maue (born 1932), German cyclist

== See also ==
- Maue, Angola
- Maue
