= Mavinga National Park =

National park in Angola

- IUCN category II (national park)
- Location within Angola
- Location: Cuando Province (Angola)
- Coordinates: 16.17°S 20.25°E
- Area: 46,076 km^{2} (17,790 sq mi)
- Established: 2011

Mavinga is a national park in Cuando Province in south-eastern Angola. It covers an area of 46,076 square kilometres (17,790 sq mi). The park was proclaimed in 2011 along with the neighbouring Luengue-Luiana National Park, which measures 22,610 km^{2} (8,730 sq mi). The two parks are contiguous and managed as a single unit. The parks were created to conserve the areas' high ecological and biological value. Mavinga forms the western border of Africa's largest conservation area, the Kavango-Zambezi Trans-Frontier Conservation Area (KaZa TFCA).

== History ==
Wildlife populations were drastically reduced during the Angolan Civil War (1975 to 2002). The Park was proclaimed in 2011 along with Luengue-Luiana National Park.

== Climate ==
The region has a Tropical Savanna Climate. Average annual rainfall varies from about 600 to 1000 mm.

== Geography and access ==
The road network within the park is fairly well developed, though many of these roads are either in poor condition, or inaccessible because of landmines remaining from the Angolan Civil War.

== Biology and ecology ==
There are five identified habitats in the two parks: open woodland, dense woodland, open grassland, aquatic vegetation, and cultivated land.

=== Flora ===
Dense miombo woodland occurs between the Longa and Cuito rivers and dominated by Brachystegia, Julbernadia, Guibortia, and probably Cryptosepalum species. Cultivated land is prominent in the northern areas around the towns of Longa and Cuito Cuanavale.

=== Fauna ===
The three-decades long Angolan Civil War contributed to the serious decline of the once abundant wildlife communities, particularly larger mammals. VERISSIMO (2008) states that more than 150 species of mammals occurred historically in Kuando Kubango.

== Fire ==
The landscape of Mavinga National Park is characterized as a fire-dependent savanna. Lightning during the rainy season can ignite fire. Fires ignited by subsistence farmers resident in the park also occur.

== Kavango-Zambezi Trans-frontier Conservation Area ==
The park falls within the Kavango Zambezi (KAZA) Transfrontier Conservation Area (TFCA), which embraces contiguous parts of southeast Angola, northern Botswana, northeast Namibia, southwest Zambia, and western Zimbabwe. It contains a mosaic of protected areas, interspersed with extensive communal lands in which small-scale pastoral and agro-pastoral land use is practiced.

== Park management ==
A park Management Plan was produced in 2016 for the period: 2016–2020. This plan focuses on key management and development issues with a short-term perspective of 5 years. It sets out the following priorities: Management priorities: Ecological • Controlling fires • Combatting poaching and illegal logging • Improving connectivity with neighbouring conservation areas • Reducing human-wildlife conflicts • Stopping the spread of urban and cultivation areas • Improving knowledge about biodiversity in the park. From an institutional and development perspective, the top priorities are: • Removing landmines • Clarifying staff structures, job descriptions and performance indicators • Construction of park entrance gates and the accompanying offices to control entry/exit • Construction of staff accommodation, garages, store-rooms etc.8 • Developing partnerships with local communities • Raising awareness about the park among residents and authorities • Developing park-specific regulations (23) • Identifying tourism potential and initiating an investor conference to attract interest.
