= Lupire =

- Commune
- Location in Angola
- Coordinates: 14.64°S 19.60°E
- Country: Angola
- Province: Cuando
- Municipality: Cuito Cuanavale
- Time zone: UTC+1 (WAT)
- Climate: Aw

Lupire is a commune in the municipality of Cuito Cuanavale in the province of Cuando in southeast Angola. As of 2014, the commune had a population of 1,600 people over an area of 6,050 square kilometres (2,340 sq mi)
