= Gilder Lehrman Institute of American History =

Organization to promote knowledge of American history

- Founded: 1994
- Founder: Richard Gilder; Lewis E. Lehrman
- Headquarters: New York, NY
- Website: https://gilderlehrman.org

The Gilder Lehrman Institute of American History is a 501(c)(3) charity and was founded in 1994 by businessmen-philanthropists Richard Gilder and Lewis E. Lehrman in New York City to promote the study and interest in American history.

Despite the conservative political activist credentials of its two founders, some prominent liberal historians familiar with them, including David Brion Davis and Henry Louis Gates Jr. insist that the two founders did not let their own political ideology influence their promotion and preservation of history, or the teachings of their organizations.

== Prizes ==
The $50,000 Gilder Lehrman Lincoln Prize was established by the institute and Gettysburg College in 1990.

The Institute established the Frederick Douglass Book Prize, a $25,000 prize, in 1999.

In partnership with Washington College and George Washington's Mount Vernon, the Institute established the $50,000 George Washington Book Prize in 2005.
