= Cuito Cuanavale =

- Municipality
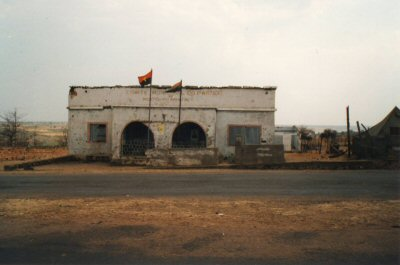
- Town hall

- Location in Angola
- Coordinates: 15°10′S 19°10′E
- Country: Angola
- Province: Cuando

Area
  - Total: 35,610 km^{2} (13,750 sq mi)

Population (2014)
  - Total: 40,829
  - Density: 1.8/km^{2} (4.7/sq mi)
- Time zone: UTC+1 (WAT)
- Climate: Cwa

Cuito Cuanavale, occasionally spelt Kuito Kuanavale or Kwito Kwanavale, is a municipality in Cuando province in Angola.

The area around the town was the scene of heavy fighting during various campaigns during the Angolan Civil War and the South African Border War, with the Battle of Cuito Cuanavale from 1987 to 1988 being the largest land battle in Africa since World War II.

== Description ==
Cuito Cuanavale is a municipality in Cuando province in Angola since that province's creation from Cuando Cubango Province in 2024. It is sometimes spelt Kuito Kuanavale or Kwito Kwanavale. It is further subdivided into the communes of Cuito Cuanavale and Lupire.

The town is situated at the confluence of two local rivers, the Cuito and the Cuanavale, from which it derives its name. The Cuanavale feeds into the Cuito, which is a principal tributary of the Okavango River, and helps to maintain the ecology of the Okavango Delta.

Cuito Cuanavale covers an area of around 35,000 square kilometres (14,000 sq mi) and its population as of 2014 was 40,829 inhabitants. Its projected population for 2022 was estimated to be 51,797.

As of the 2024 municipal reform, it is bordered by the municipalities of Dima to the east and Mavinga to the southeast, which are both in Cuando Province. It is also bordered to the west by Longa in Cubango Province, and by Alto Cuito to the north and Cangamba to the northeast, both municipalities in Moxico Province.

The town is served by Cuito Cuanavale Airport.

The city day is celebrated on October 21, with an annual celebration being organized for the occasion.

== Minefields ==
Dangerous minefields are a legacy of the 1980s war in Cuito Cuanavale; it is the most-mined town in Angola. Among many others in the area, where tens of thousands of mines were laid, is one designated by the HALO Trust as HKK029 – "one of the largest and most complicated minefields in the world", with an overall length of 18 to 20 km (11 to 12 mi). They were laid by FAPLA as they withdrew and retreated after the battle. The local people have paid a price in injuries and the mines have negatively impacted the local economy.

== See also ==
- Operation Alpha Centauri
