= Richard Gilder =

American businessman (1932–2020)

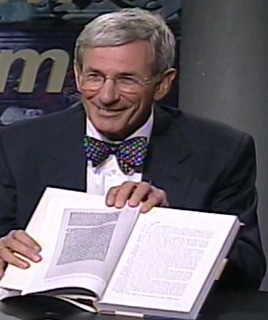
- Gilder on CUNY TV's Education Forum (2000)
- Born: May 31, 1932; Manhattan, New York City, U.S.
- Died: May 12, 2020 (aged 87); Charlottesville, Virginia, U.S.
- Education: Yale College
- Spouses: Britt-Marie Lagerljung (divorced) Virginia Chromiak (divorced) Teresa Maria Dempsey (divorced); Lois Chiles (m. 2005)
- Children: 4, including Virginia

Richard Gilder Jr. (May 31, 1932 – May 12, 2020) was an American stockbroker and philanthropist. He was a co-founder of the Gilder Lehrman Institute of American History. He also headed the brokerage firm Gilder, Gagnon, Howe & Co., whose specialty is trading leveraged stocks and shortselling. Gilder joined forces with George Soros in revitalizing Central Park, which galvanized the creation of the Central Park Conservancy, of which he was a trustee.

== Early life and education ==
Gilder was born in Manhattan on May 31, 1932, a fifth-generation New Yorker of Bohemian Jewish descent. His father, Richard Sr., worked as a property manager for a real estate company; his mother, Jane (Moyse), was a housewife. Gilder attended Northfield Mount Hermon School before enrolling in Yale College, graduating in 1954 with a BA in history. He received a Doctor of Humane Letters in 2007 from Yale. He provided $4 million, over half the necessary funding, in honor of his daughter, Virginia Gilder, a two-time Olympian, for the recently completed Gilder Boathouse for Yale rowers. The boathouse carries only the Gilder last name to honor three generations of Yale alumni.

== Career ==
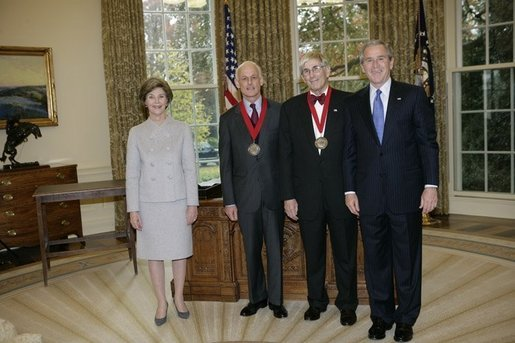
Gilder with President George W. Bush, First Lady Laura Bush, and Lewis Lehrman in 2005

After working at the brokerage firm of A.G. Becker & Co., Gilder founded the firm now known as Gilder, Gagnon, Howe & Co. in 1968. He was chairman of the executive committee at the New-York Historical Society and served on the executive board of the Omohundro Institute of Early American History and Culture. With Lewis Lehrman he was a co-founder (1994) and trustee of the Gilder Lehrman Institute.

Gilder worked together with George Soros in 1974 to revitalize Central Park. Their efforts led to the creation of the Central Park Conservancy six years later, and he served as a trustee of that organization. In 1993, he made the then-largest private donation to a public park when he promised $17 million if the Conservancy and the municipality did the same.

He was also a trustee of the Morgan Library and Museum, the American Museum of Natural History, and the Thomas Jefferson Foundation. He was chairman emeritus of the Manhattan Institute, a conservative think-tank, and the Club for Growth, a conservative political action committee, to which his ex-wife Virginia James continues to be a major donor. In 2005, Gilder and Lewis Lehrman received the National Humanities Medal for their work promoting the study of American history. He then set up a PhD program at the American Museum of Natural History in his own name, the Richard Gilder Graduate School at AMNH. In 2012, he pledged $60 million for the construction of the Richard Gilder Center for Science, Education, and Innovation, at the American Museum of Natural History.

== Personal life ==
Gilder had four children, all from his first marriage to Britt-Marie Lagerljung. One of his daughters, Virginia Gilder (born 1958), also a Yale graduate, was a member of the American women's quadruple sculls team that won the silver medal at the 1984 Summer Olympics. and is a co-owner of the Seattle Storm, a professional women's basketball team in the WNBA. His other children were Peggy, Britt-Louise, and Richard Gilder III.

Gilder's marriage to Britt-Marie, as well as his subsequent marriages to Virginia Chromiak and then Teresa Maria Dempsey, all ended in divorce. In 2005 he married former model and actress Lois Chiles. Her paternal uncle was oil tycoon Eddie Chiles.

Gilder died on May 12, 2020, at his home in Charlottesville, Virginia, at the age of 87. News of his death was first announced by his wife, who confirmed that it was due to congestive heart failure.
