= Maué, Angola =

Maue
- Commune
- Location in Angola
- Coordinates: 17°S 19°E
- Country: Angola
- Province: Cubango
- Municipality: Mavengue
- Time zone: UTC+1 (WAT)
- Climate: Aw

Maue is a commune of Angola, located in the municipality of Mavengue in the province of Cubango. Prior to Angola's 2024 administrative reforms, it was part of the municipality of Calai in the province of Cuando Cubango. As of 2014, the commune had a population of 831 people over an area of 2,100 square kilometres (810 sq mi).
