= Rito, Angola =

Rito
- Commune
- Location in Angola
- Coordinates: 16°45′S 19°00′E
- Country: Angola
- Province: Cubango
- Municipality: Nancova
- Time zone: UTC+1 (WAT)
- Climate: Aw

Rito is a commune of Angola, located in the municipality of Nancova in the province of Cubango. As of 2014, the commune had a population of 906 people over a 2,630 square kilometres (1,020 sq mi) area.
