= Bateleur FV2 =

Bateleur
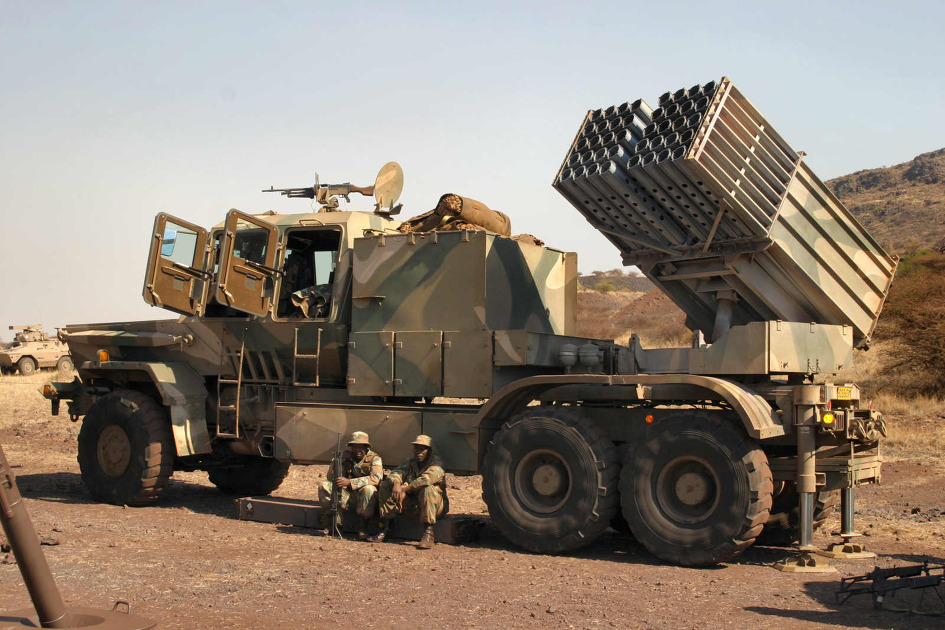
- Type: Multiple rocket launcher
- Place of origin: South Africa

Service history
- In service: 1979–present
- Used by: South African National Defence Force

Production history
- Designer: Denel, Somchem

Specifications
- Mass: 9,500 kg (20,944 lbs)
- Length: 8.53 m (28 ft 0 in)
- Width: 2.425 m (7 ft 11.5 in)
- Height: 3.125 m (10 ft 3.0 in)
- Crew: 5
- Cartridge: HE-Fragmentation: 2.68 m (8 ft 10 in)
- Caliber: 127 mm (5 in)
- Barrels: 40
- Rate of fire: 1 per sec
- Effective firing range: 36 km (22 mi)
- Engine: V10 diesel 268hp
- Transmission: ZF 56-65 Synchromesh
- Suspension: Kwêvoël 100 10-ton 6x6 truck
- Operational range: 1,000 km (620 mi)
- Maximum speed: 90 km/h (56 mph) (road)

The Bateleur is a South African self-propelled multiple rocket launcher. It is a 127mm system with a wheeled launcher vehicle, disposable pods, and fire control equipment developed by Denel Land Systems. Based on a mine protected Kwêvoël 100 10 ton 6x6 carrier. Its mission is to engage in counter-battery strikes against hostile artillery and air defences as far as 36 km (22 mi) away. Other potential warheads include cluster and an anti-tank mine dispenser. The weapon can fire up to 40 127mm pre-fragmented high explosive warheads to ranges of 7.5 km to 36 km at sea level singly or using ripple fire, firing up to 1 rocket per second. Reload can take less than 10 minutes and in/out-of-action time is one and two minutes respectively. The system is supported by a Kwêvoël 100 ammunition truck carrying 96 rockets and crew who help with the reloading.

The system was previously called the Valkiri MkII as it was developed from the Valkiri MRLS which is itself based on the Soviet BM-21 Grad.

== Variants ==
- Bateleur FV2 (current version): 40 launch tubes mounted on an armoured Samil 100 6x6 truck.
- Modified version to fire 122mm rockets
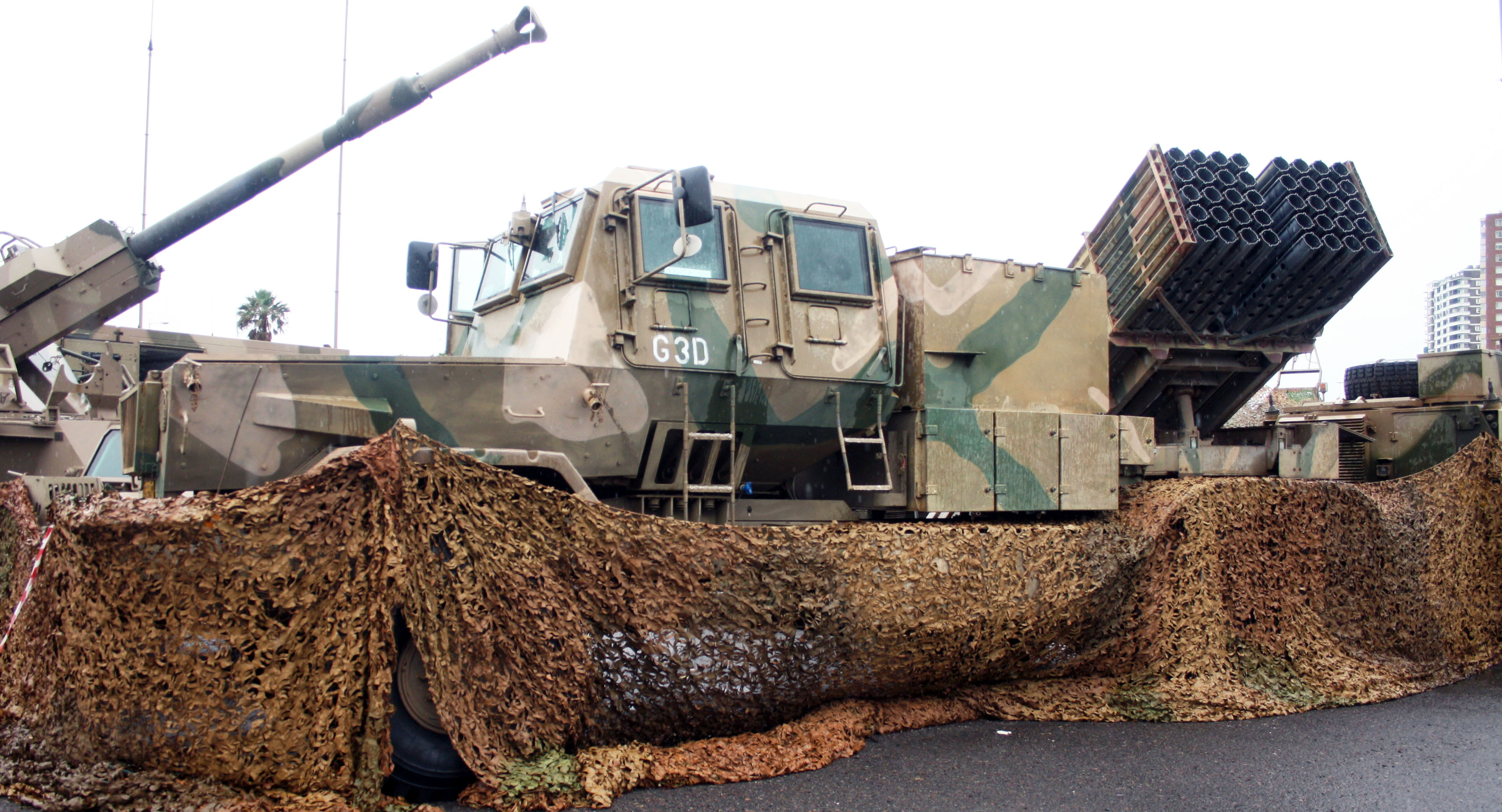
Bateleur 40 tube Multiple Rocket Launcher on SAMIL 100 armoured four door cab truck

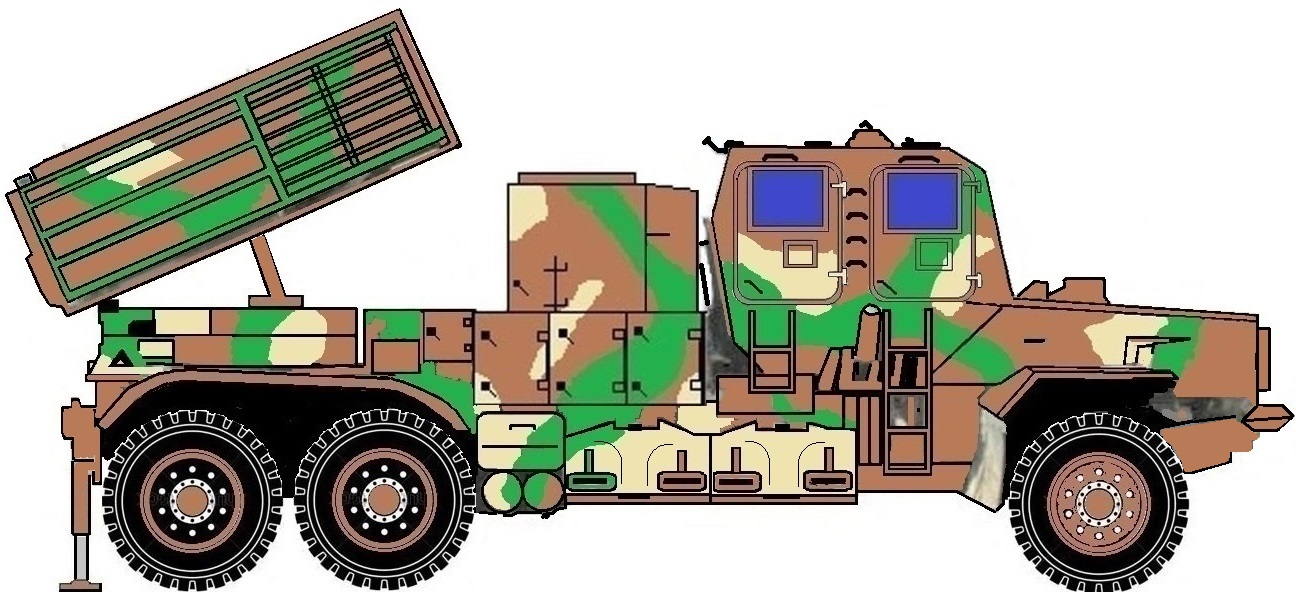

== Operators ==
- South Africa - South African National Defence Force: 25
