= Xamavera =

- Commune
- Location in Angola
- Coordinates: 17.43°S 20.27°E
- Country: Angola
- Province: Cuando
- Municipality: Dirico
- Time zone: UTC+1 (WAT)
- Climate: Aw

Xamavera is a commune in the municipality of Dirico in Cuando Province in southeast Angola.
