= Cuito Cuanavale Airport =

Airport in Angola

- IATA: CTI; ICAO: FNCV

Summary
- Airport type: Public
- Serves: Cuito Cuanavale
- Location: Angola
- Elevation AMSL: 3,986 ft / 1,215 m
- Coordinates: 15°9′35″S 19°9′20″E

Map
- Location of Cuito Cuanavale Airport in Angola

Runways
Direction	Length		Surface
Direction	m	ft	Surface
13/31	2,735	8,973	Asphalt
- Source: GCM Landings.com Google Maps

Cuito Cuanavale Airport (IATA: CTI, ICAO: FNCV) is an airport serving Cuito Cuanavale in Cuando Cubango Province, Angola.

The Cuito Cuanavale non-directional beacon (Ident: CV) is located on the field.

== See also ==
- List of airports in Angola
- Transport in Angola
