= List of protected areas in Angola =

The protected areas of Angola include national parks, partial nature reserves, integral nature reserves, and regional nature parks. As of mid-2020, protected areas 87,507 km, or 7% of Angola's land area.

== National parks ==
(IUCN protected area category II)

- Bicuar National Park (7,900 km²) est. 1964
- Cameia National Park (14,450 km²) est. 1938
- Cangandala National Park (630 km²) est. 1970
- Iona National Park (15,150 km²) est. 1964
- Luengue-Luiana National Park (22,610 km²) est. 1966
- Maiombe National Park, est. 2011
- Mavinga National Park (5,950 km²) est. 1966
- Mupa National Park (6,600 km²) est. 1964
- Quiçama National Park (9,960 km²) est. 1957

== Integral nature reserves ==
(IUCN protected area category IV)

- Ilheu dos Passaros Integral Nature Reserve (2 km²) est. 1973
- Luando Integral Nature Reserve (8280 km²) est. 1957

== Partial reserves ==
(IUCN protected area category IV)

- Buffalo Partial Reserve (400 km²) est. 1974
- Namibe Partial Reserve (4,450 km²) est. 1960

== Regional nature parks ==
(IUCN protected area category V)

- Chimalavera Regional Nature Park (100 km²) est. 1974

== Marine conservation areas ==
(IUCN protected area category V)

- Namibe Marine Conservation Area (proposed)

== Mountain ranges ==
(IUCN protected area category VI)

- Serra de Moco (proposed)
- Serra da Cumbira (proposed)
- Serra do Pingano (proposed)
