= Savate, Angola =

Savate
- Municipality
- Location in Angola
- Coordinates: 16°49′59″S 17°57′44″E
- Country: Angola
- Province: Cubango
- Time zone: UTC+1 (WAT)
- Climate: Aw

Savate is a municipality of Angola, located in the province of Cubango. It contains the communes of Savate and Bondo Caíla. Prior to Angola's 2024 administrative reforms, Savate was a commune in the municipality of Cuangar in Cuando Cubango Province. As of 2014, the commune of Savate had a population of 13,291 people over an area of 8,460 square kilometres (3,270 sq mi).
