= Cubango Province =

Province of Angola

Cubango
- Province
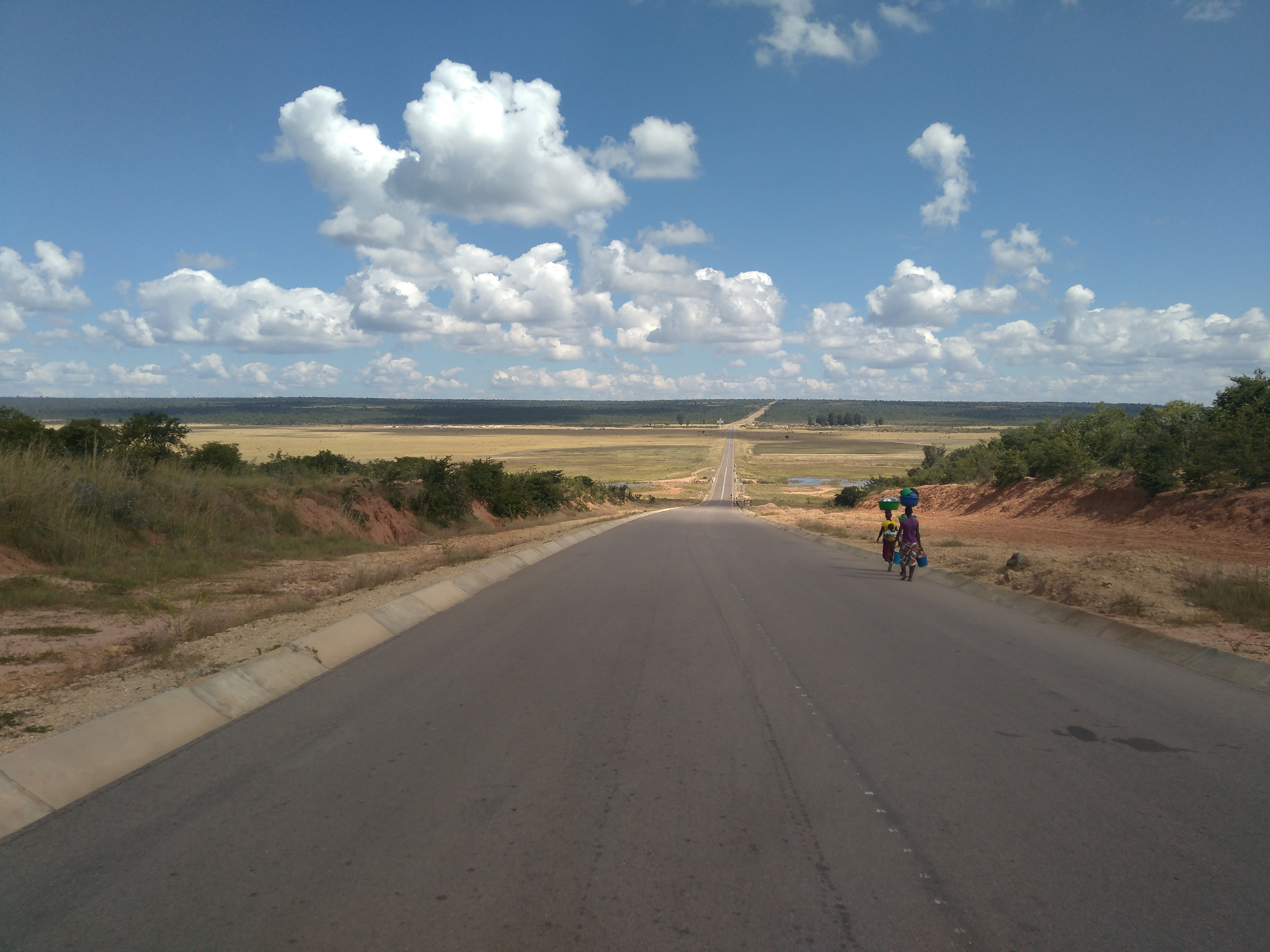
- Road near Longa in 2017

- Coordinates: 15°S 18°E
- Country: Angola
- Established: 5 September 2024
- Capital: Menongue

Government
  - Governor: José Martins (MPLA)
  - Vice-Governor for the Political, Social and Economic Sector: Helena Lourenco Chimena
  - Vice-Governor for Technical Services and Infrastructure: Joao Bonifacio Cassanga

Area
  - Total: 91,466 km^{2} (35,315 sq mi)

Population (2024)
  - Total: 570,447
  - Density: 6.2367/km^{2} (16.153/sq mi)
- Time zone: UTC+1 (WAT)

Cubango is a province of Angola. It was created on 5 September 2024 from the western part of Cuando Cubango Province. Its capital is Menongue.

== Geography and climate ==
Cubango borders the Angolan provinces of Cunene to the west, Huíla to the northwest, Bié to the north, Moxico to the northeast, and Cuando to the east. It also borders the Namibian regions of Kavango East, Kavango West, and Ohangwena to the southeast, south, and southwest respectively. The province is drained by the Cubango River, which forms most of the province's border with Namibia, and its tributary the Cuito River forms much of the province's border with Cuando.

The northern part of Cubango belongs to the dry miombo woodlands ecoregion, while the south falls in the Zambezian Baikiaea woodlands ecoregion.

Cubango's climate varies from tropical in the north to semi-arid in the south. Annual rainfall ranges from 1,200 mm (47 in) in the north to 600 mm (24 in) in the south.

== History ==
Since at least 2016, there had been proposals to divide Cuando Cubango, formerly Angola's second largest province by area, into two smaller provinces. On 14 August 2024, Angola's National Assembly approved a law to create three new provinces, including the division of Cuando Cubango into the provinces of Cuando and Cubango. This law went into effect with its publication in the official gazette of Angola on 5 September 2024.

== Administration ==
Cubango is divided into the eleven municipalities of Caiundo, Calai, Chinguanja, Cuangar, Cuchi, Cutato, Longa, Mavengue, Menongue, Nancova, and Savate. Caiundo is further subdivided into the communes of Caiundo and Jamba; Cutato is subdivided into the communes of Cutato and Vissati; Longa is subdivided into the communes of Baixo Longa and Longa; Mavengue is subdivided into the communes of Maué and Mavengue; and Nancova is subdivided into the communes of Nancova and Rito.

The first governor of Cubango is José Martins, who was appointed in December 2024 after having been the last governor of Cuando Cubango.

== Demographics ==
The former communes that now make up the territory of Cubango reported a combined population of 435,583 in the 2014 Angolan census. A variety of languages are spoken in Cubango, with Nganguela being the most common.

== Economy and infrastructure ==
The main agricultural activity in Cubango is cattle, goat and sheep farming. An iron mine at Cutato began operations in 2021, and is run by a public–private partnership between state-owned Ferrangoland and the Brazilian company Modulax. Ore from the mine is transported to the port of Namibe in Moçâmedes via the Moçâmedes Railway, which runs near the site and terminates at Menongue.

As of 2024, Menongue Airport has regularly scheduled service on TAAG Angola Airlines to Luanda and Cuíto. Roads in the province south of Caiundo have been in poor condition since the end of the Angolan Civil War.
