= Nancova =

- Municipality
- Location in Angola
- Coordinates: 16°23′13″S 18°59′13″E
- Country: Angola
- Province: Cubango

Area
  - Total: 10,310 km^{2} (3,980 sq mi)

Population (2014)
  - Total: 2,796
  - Density: 0.2712/km^{2} (0.7024/sq mi)
- Time zone: UTC+1 (WAT)

Nancova is a municipality of the province of Cubango in Angola. The population is 2,796 in 2014 in an area of 10,310 km^{2}. The municipality consists of the communes Nancova and Rito.
