= Luengue-Luiana National Park =

National park in Cuando Province, Angola

- IUCN category II (national park)
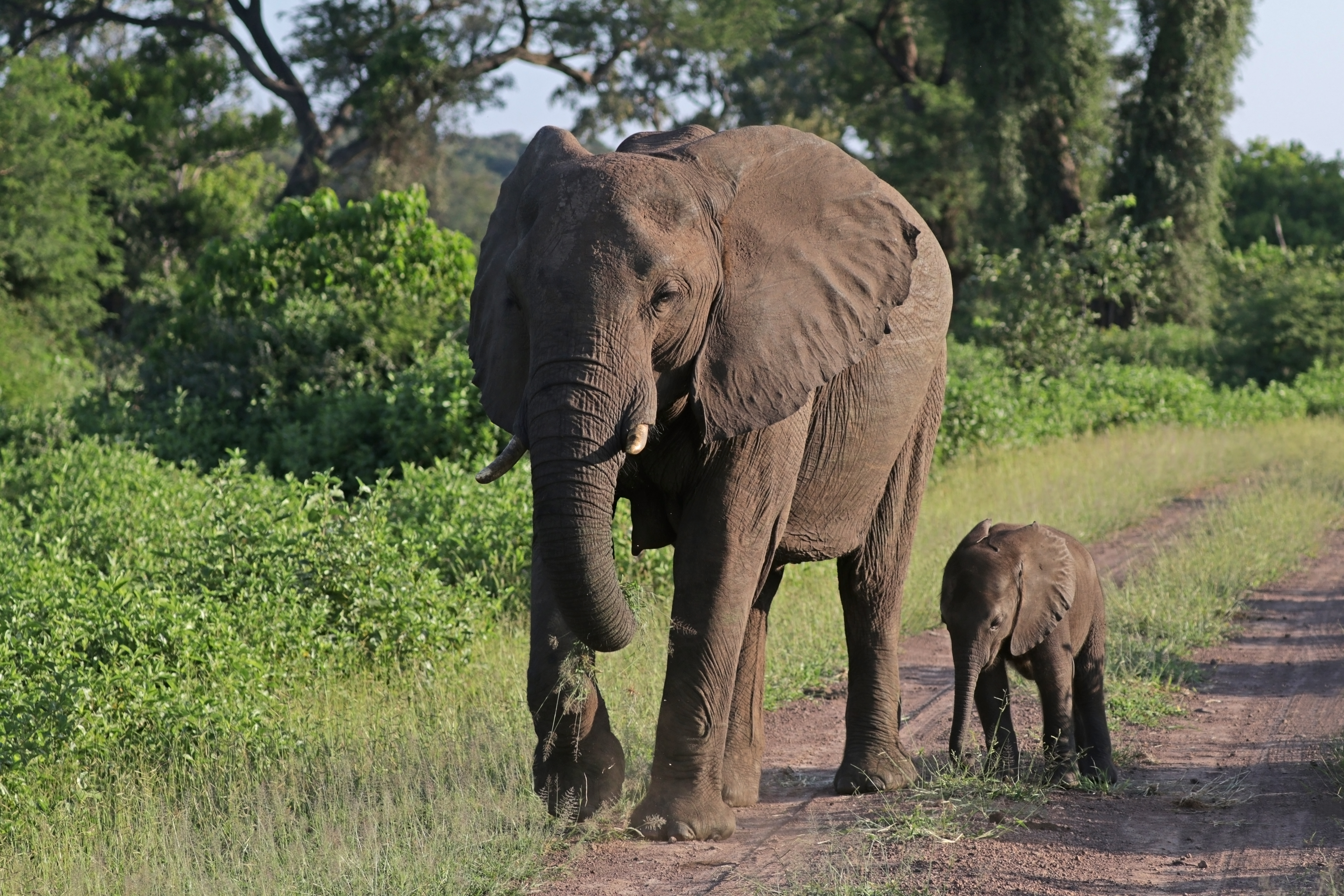
- Bush elephant with six-week old baby
- Interactive map of Luengue-Luiana National Park
- Location: Cuando Province (Angola)
- Coordinates: 16°35′S 21°50′E
- Area: 42,000 km^{2} (16,000 sq mi)
- Established: 2011

Luengue-Luiana National Park (Portuguese: Parque Nacional do Luengue-Luiana) is a national park in Angola.

== Geography ==
The park covers an area of 42,000 km². It is located in Cuando Province in the southeastern corner of Angola. The park is bounded on the west and southwest by the Kavango River, on the south by the border with Namibia, on the east by the Cuando River, which forms the border with Zambia, and on the north by Longa-Mavinga National Park.

== Ecology ==
The majority of the park is open woodland. The predominant trees are species of Burkea, Baikiaea, Pterocarpus, and Erythrophleum in the southern portion of the park, and Erythrophleum, Burkea, Julbernardia, and Guibourtia in the northern areas of the park. The spacing of the trees varies considerably from place to place. The ground is covered with sparse grass, in part due to leached sandy soil, which holds little water near the surface. There are small areas of dense woodland in the north-central area of the park.

Along the Cuando River lie broad stretches of grasslands, 10–15 kilometers wide, that are seasonally or permanently flooded, with smaller flooded areas found along the park’s other rivers. Papyrus is predominant closest to the rivers and in deeper waters, with species of Phragmites and Miscanthus common in shallower water, upstream areas, and seasonally-dry areas.

The park is home to a broad variety of wildlife, including large mammals like African bush elephant (Loxodonta africana), giraffe (Giraffa camelopardalis), black rhinoceros (Diceros bicornis), hippopotamus (Hippopotamus amphibius), common eland (Taurotragus oryx), plains zebra (Equus quagga), African buffalo (Syncerus caffer), sable antelope (Hippotragus niger), leopard (Panthera pardus), waterbuck (Kobus ellipsiprymnus), and impala (Aepyceros melampus). The park is home to many smaller mammals and birds, and the park's wetlands are home to migratory and resident water birds.

Wildlife was diminished by poaching and over-hunting during the long Angolan Civil War. Wildlife has recovered somewhat since the end of the war, but poaching, bushmeat hunting, and land mines remain threats to its recovery. The park's many land mines kill and maim elephants, African buffalo, hippos, and other large animals. They also impede anti-poaching patrols and limit the park's potential to accommodate eco-tourism. In 2019, HALO Trust, an international NGO dedicated to removing land mines, estimated that 153 minefields remained in Luengue-Luiana and Longa-Mavinga national parks. In July 2019, the Angolan Government pledged $60 million to clear landmines in the region, which HALO and the government hope to complete by 2025.

== Transfrontier conservation area ==
The park is part of the Kavango-Zambezi Transfrontier Conservation Area, a group of adjacent protected areas in the upper Zambezi River and Okavango basins that extend across portions of Angola, Namibia, Botswana, Zambia, and Zimbabwe. The park adjoins Zambia's Sioma Ngwezi National Park across the Cuando River to the east, and Bwabwata National Park to the south in Namibia.

== History ==
During the colonial period, hunting reserves (coutadas) were established in the region. The area saw little fighting during the 1961-1974 Angolan War of Independence. However, the region was the scene of fighting during the 1975-2002 Angolan Civil War. The combatants placed thousands of land mines in the park, and many remain. In September 2019, Prince Harry visited the park and spoke about the urgent importance of removing land mines from the region, and praised the government's recent commitment of funds to land mine removal.

The park was created in 2011 by National Assembly Decree (No. 38/11, 29 December), which proclaimed the Luengue-Luiana and Mavinga national parks. The new park includes the former Luiana and Mucusso reserves.

The park is governed by the Ministry of Hotels and Tourism.
