= List of provinces of Angola by Human Development Index =

Map of the Angolan provinces by HDI in 2017. Legend: 0.555 – 0.699 (Medium HDI) < 0.555 (Low HDI)

This is a list of provinces of Angola by Human Development Index as of 2023.

Rank	Province	HDI (2023)
High human development
1	Luanda	0.733
2	Cabinda	0.711
Medium human development
3	Zaire	0.645
–	Angola (average)	0.616
4	Namibe	0.613
5	Lunda Sul	0.607
6	Bengo	0.603
7	Malanje	0.593
8	Cuanza Norte	0.577
9	Uíge	0.569
10	Huambo	0.564
11	Benguela	0.562
Low human development
12	Lunda Norte	0.547
13	Cunene	0.544
14	Huíla	0.546
15	Cuando Cubango	0.541
16	Moxico	0.534
17	Bié	0.526
18	Cuanza Sul	0.497
