= Virginia Gilder =

American rower

Ginny Gilder
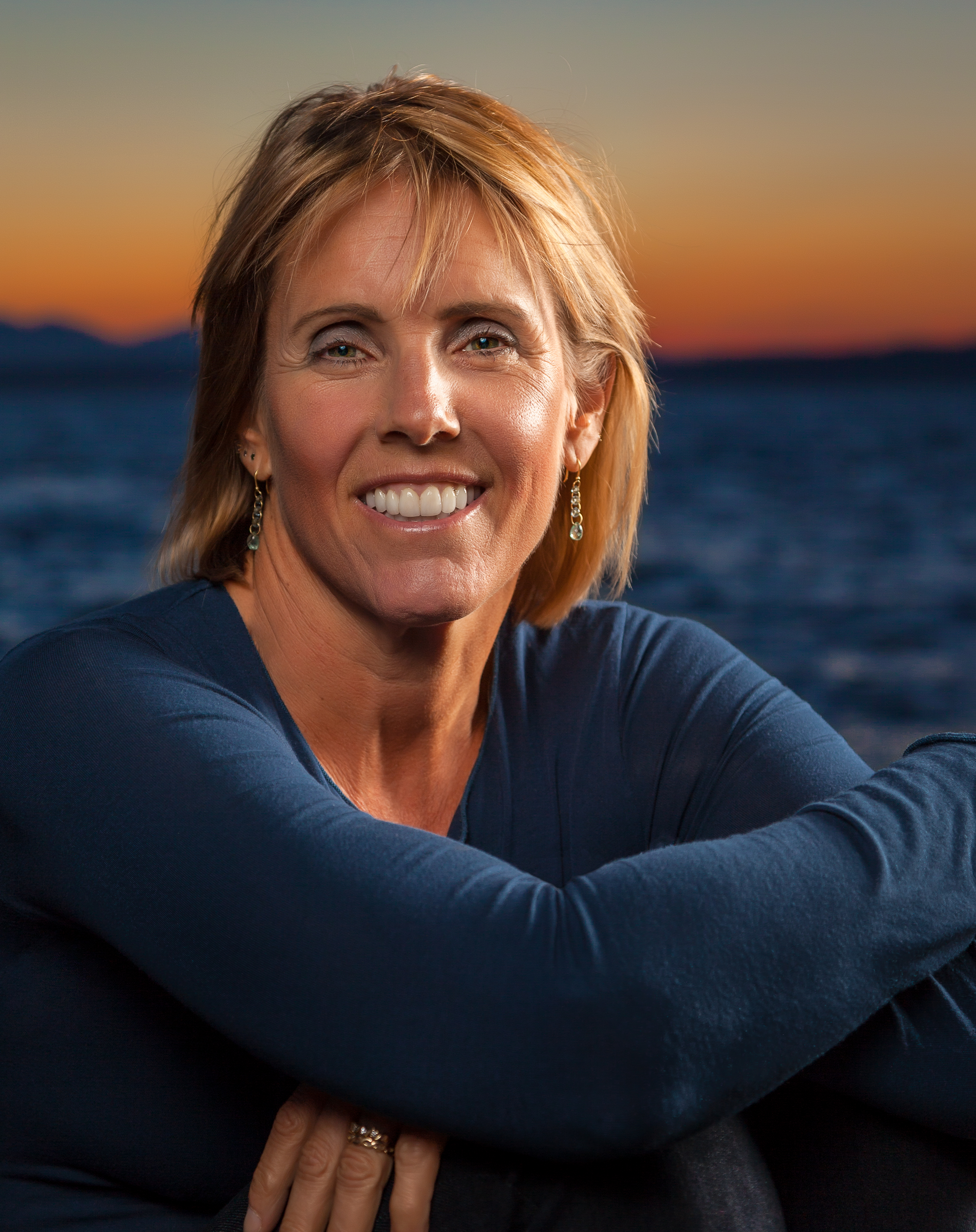

Personal information
- Born: Virginia Anne Gilder; June 4, 1958 (age 68) New York, New York, U.S.
- Education: Yale University (1979)
- Occupation(s): Entrepreneur, investor
- Other interests: Co-owner of Seattle Storm
Medal record
Women's rowing
Representing the United States
Olympic Games
Silver medal – second place	1984 Los Angeles	Coxed quad sculls

Virginia Anne Gilder (born June 4, 1958), also known as Ginny Gilder, is a former American rower and Olympic silver medalist. Gilder is a co-owner of the Seattle Storm, a professional women's basketball team in the WNBA.

== Early life ==
Gilder is the daughter of Richard Gilder and was raised on the Upper East Side of Manhattan. She attended the Chapin School, followed by Dana Hall School where she graduated one year early.

In 1976, Gilder attended Yale University, graduating with a degree in history in 1979.

== Rowing career ==
While at Yale, Gilder was on the women's crew team. However, there was no locker room available for the women's crew team, so they had to wait on the bus after practice while the men showered before they could return to campus.

In 1976, she was part of a protest in which nineteen members of the Yale women's crew wrote "TITLE IX" on their bodies and went into athletic director Joni Barnett's office naked, and then rower Chris Ernst read a statement about the way they were being treated. This protest was noted by newspapers around the world, including The New York Times. By 1977, a women's locker room was added to Yale's boathouse.

Gilder was first selected for the U.S. Olympic team in 1980, the year that the United States boycotted the Olympic Games in Moscow, Russia. She was one of 461 athletes to receive a Congressional Gold Medal many years later. She was a member of the American women's quadruple sculls team that won the silver medal at the 1984 Summer Olympics in Los Angeles, California.

== Author and private life ==
She is the author of Course Correction: A Story of Rowing and Resilience in the Wake of Title IX which was released April 14, 2015 by Beacon Press. The paperback and audiobook were released April 12, 2016.

In 2012, Gilder married Lynn Slaughter.

Sporting positions
Preceded by Clay Bennett	Seattle Storm principal owner 2008–present Served alongside: Lisa Brummel, Dawn Trudeau and Sue Bird	Incumbent
