= Valkiri =

South African multiple rocket launcher

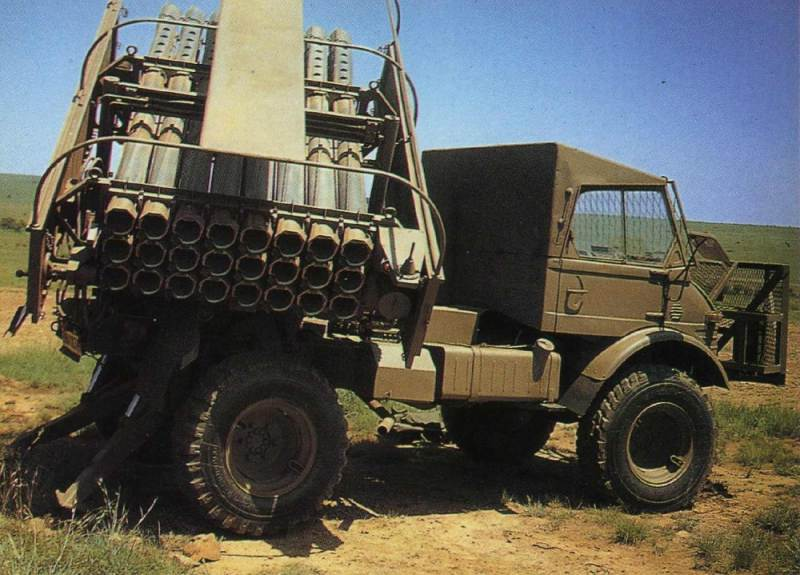
- Type: Multiple rocket launcher
- Place of origin: South Africa

Service history
- In service: 1972–present
- Used by: South African National Defence Force
- Wars: South African Border War; Angolan Civil War

Production history
- Designer: Armscor, Somchem
- Variants: Bateleur (40 launch tubes)

Specifications
- Mass: 6,400 kg (14,080 lbs)
- Length: 5.35 m (17 ft 7 in)
- Width: 2.3 m (7 ft 7 in)
- Height: 2.32 m (7 ft 7 in)
- Crew: 2
- Caliber: 127 mm (5 in)
- Barrels: 24
- Effective firing range: 36 km (22 mi)
- Filling: HE-Fragmentation 2.68 m (8 ft 10 in)
- Engine: diesel
- Suspension: Mercedes Benz Unimog 4×4 truck
- Operational range: 400 km (250 mi)
- Maximum speed: 90 km/h (56 mph) (road)

The Valkiri is a South African self-propelled multiple rocket launcher. It is a 127mm system with a wheeled launcher vehicle, and fire control equipment developed by Armscor. Contemporary models consist of a single launch module with five eight-cell rocket pods on a Unimog or SAMIL-100 carrier. Its mission is to engage in counter-battery strikes against hostile artillery and air defences as far as 36 km (22 mi) away. Other potential warheads include cluster and an anti-tank mine dispenser.

== Background ==
In history, there are many examples of the use of these types of vehicles. In the second world war, its use by Soviet Union became famous: Katyusha rocket launcher or "Stalin's organ".

The system is inspired by the Soviet BM-21 Grad, which was deployed against South African expeditionary forces in Angola during Operation Savannah. Development was completed in 1971. Valkiris played a key role in Operation Alpha Centauri and Operation Moduler during the late 1980s.

South Africa developed its arms industry in the follow-up of the international sanctions against apartheid, which foreclosed its access to the international arms market. The UN voted for voluntary sanctions by 1963 and made these compulsory by 1977.

== Variants ==
- Valkiri-22 Mk 1 (original version): 24 launch tubes mounted on a Unimog light 4x4 truck.

- Bateleur (current version): 40 launch tubes mounted on an armoured Samil 100 6x6 truck.
- Valkiri-5 a shortened lighter trailer-mounted version for airborne use. It has 12 launch tubes and uses a shortened version of the 127 mm rocket that has a maximum range of 5500 metres.

== Operators ==
- South Africa - South African National Defence Force: 76 in reserve.
