= Democratic International =

1985 meeting of anti-Communist rebels in Angola

- Date: 1985
- Venue: UNITA headquarters
- Location: Jamba, Angola
- Also known as: Jamboree in Jamba
- Type: Political gathering
- Theme: Anti-Communism
- Patrons: Lewis Lehrman, United States, Israel, South Africa

The Democratic International, also known as the Jamboree in Jamba, was a 1985 meeting of anti-Communist rebels held at the headquarters of UNITA in Jamba, Angola.

The meeting was primarily funded by former Rite Aid President Lewis Lehrman and organized by anti-Communist activists Jack Abramoff and Jack Wheeler. While the Reagan administration privately supported the meeting, it did not publicize its position. In a private letter to Abramoff, Reagan wrote:

"Those of us lucky enough to live in democratic lands have to be moved by the example of men and women who struggle every day, at great personal risk, for rights that we have enjoyed from birth. Their goals are our goals"

The governments of Israel and South Africa supported the idea, but both respective countries were deemed inadvisable for hosting the conference.

Participants in the conference included at least four leaders of anti-communist insurgent movements: Jonas Savimbi, Adolfo Calero, Pa Kao Her, and Abdul Rahim Wardak. These insurgent leaders represented the following organizations: UNITA, Nicaraguan Democratic Force, Neo Hmong and National Islamic Front of Afghanistan, respectively. The Khmer Rouge, as well as RENAMO were invited to the Jamboree, but were unable to attend. The English translator in tow with the Laotian cadre "Ethnics Liberation Organization of Laos" reportedly referred to Jonas Savimbi as "Dr. Zimbabwe" multiple times in translation. A number of American conservative lobbyists were also in attendance, including Jack Abramoff, Lewis Lehrman, and Jack Wheeler. Military representatives of South Africa and the US, including Lieutenant Colonel Oliver North, were present as well. Lehrman distributed copies of the Declaration of Independence to each participant

Security at the event was handled by the South African Defence Force.

The participants released a communiqué stating:

We, free peoples fighting for our national independence and human rights, assembled at Jamba, declare our solidarity with all freedom movements in the world and state our commitment to cooperate to liberate our nations from the Soviet Imperialists.

== See also ==
- Cold War
- International Freedom Foundation
- Resistance International
