= Lewis Lehrman =

American banker (1938–2026)

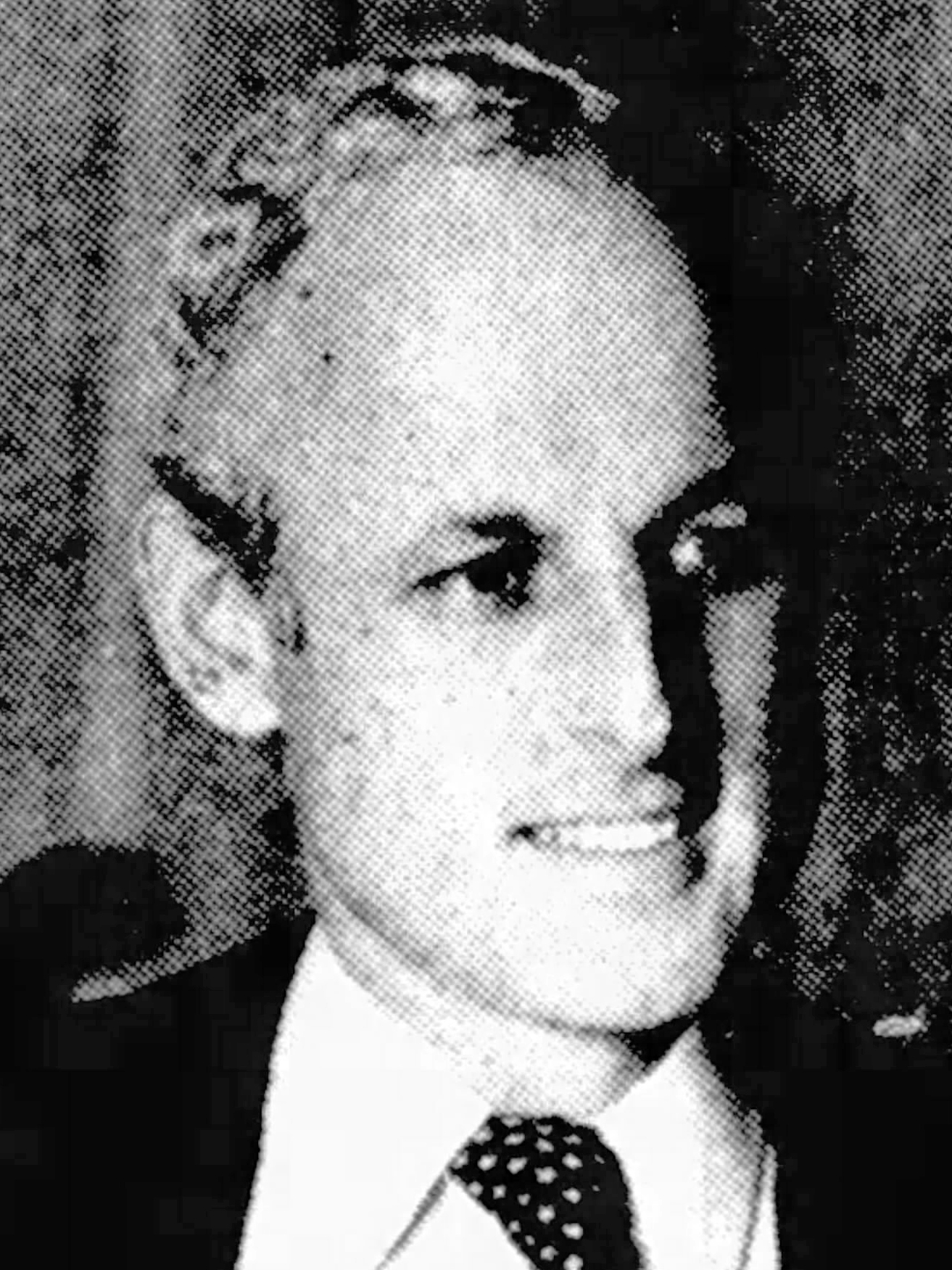
- Lehrman in 1982
- Born: August 15, 1938; Harrisburg, Pennsylvania, U.S.
- Died: March 11, 2026 (aged 87); Greenwich, Connecticut, U.S.
- Education: Yale University (BA); Harvard University (MA)
- Political party: Republican

Lewis E. Lehrman (August 15, 1938 – March 11, 2026) was an American investment banker, historian and politician. He was awarded the National Humanities Medal by President George W. Bush in 2005 for his contributions to American history, Abraham Lincoln scholarship, and monetary policy.

Lehrman wrote for the Lincoln Institute. He was a senior partner at L. E. Lehrman & Co., an investment firm he established in 1981. He was also the chairman of the Lehrman Institute, a public policy research and grant-making foundation founded in 1972.

On November 10, 2005, Lehrman and Richard Gilder were awarded the National Humanities Medal in an Oval Office ceremony by US President George W. Bush.

== Early life and education ==
Lehrman was born on August 15, 1938, in Harrisburg, Pennsylvania, the son of Rose (Herman) and Benjamin Sachs Lehrman, who was chairman of the Rite Aid Corporation. His family is Jewish but Lehrman converted to Roman Catholicism

He attended The Hill School, a boarding school in Pottstown, Pennsylvania. Lehrman's engagement in teaching of history began as a Carnegie Teaching Fellow at Yale University in 1960 and subsequently at Harvard University, where he completed a master's degree as a Woodrow Wilson fellow.

== Career ==
Lehrman was a past president of Rite Aid Corporation, a writer, businessman, and economic historian.

=== Rite Aid ===
Rite Aid Corporation was an outgrowth of a family wholesale grocery business in central Pennsylvania, Louis Lehrman & Son, founded by Lehrman's grandfather, Louis, and expanded by his father, Benjamin. On holidays as a teenager, Lehrman worked part-time at the firm. He later worked summers and holidays at the company while continuing his education at Yale and Harvard before enlisting in the U.S. Army Reserves.

In 1962, in Pennsylvania, the company began opening health and beauty stores; it was then a small-town competitor for both customers and store leases. Lehrman joined the company full-time in 1964—the same year the first Rite Aid pharmacy was opened in New York State. "Lehrman was forced to go from town to town, looking for older stores in downtown areas where landlords were more desperate for tenants, even unknowns", reported the New York Times. "Having found a site, he and his partners would devote a Saturday in painting and remodeling (usually spending less than $10,000) and a Sunday to stocking shelves. On Monday, the store would be open for business."

Rite Aid went public in a successful 1968 stock offering and continued expansion. At the time, with 32 percent of the company's stock, Lewis Lehrman was the company's president and largest stockholder. Alex Grass, Lehrman's brother-in-law, brought into the business by Lehrman's father, was eventually named chief executive.

Lehrman stepped down as Rite Aid president in 1977 and as chairman of the firm's executive committee in 1981, eventually severing all ties with the company. His role in what Lehrman called "help[ing] to build Rite Aid" became a political issue in Lehrman's 1982 New York State gubernatorial campaign when Grass, who was then the company's chairman and CEO, took issue with published articles that gave credit to Lehrman for the company's growth. New York Magazine's Michael Kramer interviewed Grass for a profile on Lehrman. Lehrman "wasn't the founder. I was", said Grass. After quoting Grass's version of the founding of Rite Aid, Kramer wrote: "Grass of course, is denigrating Lehrman, and as for the facts, they aren't facts at all, or at least they are disputed facts. They are disputed by a host of former and present Rite Aid officers and directors with whom I spoke." Kramer went on to quote other Rite Aid officers and directors. Lehrman "took a sleepy little company and breathed life into it", said one company director. Maxwell Rabb, a Rite Aid director and former ambassador to Italy, declared: "Lew's role was at least the equal of anyone else's."

Lehrman was also a managing director of Morgan Stanley in the late 1980s. After Morgan Stanley, in 1991, he established an investment company, L. E. Lehrman & Co. He was also an investor in George W. Bush's Arbusto Energy.

=== New York gubernatorial campaign ===
Lehrman was the president of Rite Aid until 1977 and resigned from all positions in 1981 to run for Governor of New York the following year. He said that "elective office is the only way to get things done". He was well known for wearing red suspenders in his campaign commercials. On June 16, 1982, Lehrman was chosen as the official GOP designee for governorship, getting "68.88 percent of the weighted votes at a hectic meeting of the Republican State Committee in Manhattan". He would later win the primary and become the Republican candidate for governor.

Popular historian Samuel G. Freedman wrote that,

Lehrman's goals, the party went far beyond solvency or an orderly transfer of power. What was needed was a populist uprising with a manifesto to match. Lehrman planned to create both the same way he had created the Rite Aid network, by driving to cities and towns and paying attention to Main Street.

The Republican gubernatorial candidate came into conflict with some top Republican members of the legislature over his tax reduction program. Asked about their differences in the final Inside Albany debate, Lehrman said,

I've put this issue to the voters. I'm not putting it to the legislators. Who rules New York State, 211 legislators or 18 million free people? That's the question. Who rules the government of the State of New York? Is it owned and operated by the politicians and the bureaucrats, or is it owned for the purpose of benefiting the 18 million people who live here? That's the issue.

Running on the lines of the Republican and Conservative Parties, Lehrman was defeated by then-Lieutenant Governor Mario Cuomo, 51–47%, by far less a margin than was expected. Cuomo ran on the lines of the Democratic and Liberal Parties, after defeating New York City Mayor Edward I. Koch in the Democratic Party primary election. Lehrman won the Republican nomination in a primary against attorney Paul J. Curran after several other Republican candidates dropped out of the race. Political scientists Peter W. Colby and John K. White noted a sharp upstate-downstate split in the race, with Cuomo carrying a 575,000-vote advantage in New York City.

E. J. McMahon, who covered the race as a journalist, opined:

The debates between the two gubernatorial candidates were sharp exchanges on issues involving the state's economic and crime problems. The public encounters of Mario M. Cuomo and Lewis E. Lehrman in the closing weeks of the 1982 gubernatorial campaign produced a substantive, often lively, at times intense, but consistently civil exchange of ideas.

The New York Times reported after the New York Post debate at the beginning of October, "Lieut. Gov. Mario M. Cuomo and Lewis E. Lehrman argued without significant interruptions for 50 minutes yesterday in their first debate of the New York gubernatorial campaign. What were to have been two-minute opening statements stretched to 25 minutes as the two—intense but seemingly not angry—alternated ripostes and kept their own informal time limits. At one point, Mr. Cuomo gestured to the four panelists and said, 'Maybe we should let them play.'"

High national and state unemployment hurt Lehrman's campaign. The general election campaign for governor was billed as a "referendum on Reaganomics". However, if the election had been a referendum on Reaganomics and unemployment, Cuomo would have won by a margin reflecting his party's enormous voter-registration edge and allowing room for a few disgruntled Republicans and Independents as well, according to a Princeton University thesis on the gubernatorial campaign. "Instead, Lew Lehrman was able to use technologies such as television and direct mail to campaign 'offensively' on issues which were more favorable for him such as the death penalty, crime, welfare fraud, prayer in schools, and unpopular record of the [Hugh] Carey Administration. Moreover, he was able to blunt the Reaganomics issue by widely publicizing an economic plan of his own." Lehrman was also critical of the national Republican strategy in the election at a time when U.S. unemployment was over 10 percent: "I believe the Reagan Administration should be making a major effort to show clearly how we are going to rebuild the economy and create 20 million jobs in the next 10 years", he told the New York Times. He added: "A slogan like 'Stay the Course' is inadequate."

Lehrman's commercial advertising was large and with strong intensity. The Christian Science Monitor reported late in the campaign: "The ads have aired so frequently that The New Yorker magazine ran a cartoon showing a parrot next to a television set. The parrot says, 'I'm Lew Lehrman. Lew Lehrman for governor!...' In his Borough Park, Brooklyn, campaign swing here recently, one youngster shouted, 'There's the man on TV!'" Cuomo sought to make Lehrman's spending a campaign issue. Lehrman "was a clean slate upon which any image could be drawn through television and radio ads," wrote Cuomo in the Diaries of Mario M. Cuomo. "The polls indicated that neither the gold standard nor Reaganomics would enhance the image—the public knew little of the former and New York State was suffering severely from the Reagan Recession and budget cuts—so these issues were ignored. Instead, television ads—four or five million dollars' worth to begin—depicted Lehrman as a genial family man who knew how to produce jobs—his successful business career was proof—and stop crime—with capital punishment." In his diary, Cuomo complained about Lehrman's high spending on direct mail and television advertising but admitted in late October 1982: "A strange problem has developed. We have more than we can spend—much more!" Cuomo won and would go on to serve three terms as governor before he was defeated for re-election in 1994.

=== Academics and history advocacy ===
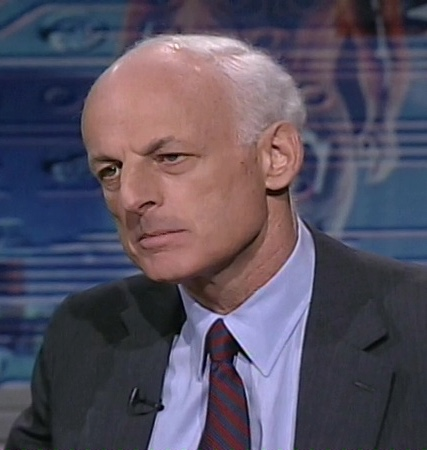
Lehrman, along with Richard Gilder, appeared on CUNY TV's Education Forum on October 1, 2000 to speak about Gilder Lehrman Institute of American History.

In the 1970s, Lehrman returned to Yale University to head up a review of the humanities curriculum for the Yale University Council. For the Gilder Lehrman Collection, Lewis Lehrman and Richard Gilder collected historical documents in order to place them into a collection where they would be available to scholars and the public. First put on deposit at the Morgan Library, the Gilder Lehrman Collection is now on deposit at the New-York Historical Society. By 2006, the GLC had amassed more than 60,000 documents and other historical items, mostly on 18th and 19th Century America. Articles from those periods have been used in exhibits at George Washington's Mount Vernon, Gettysburg, the Morgan Library, and the New York Historical Society. Lehrman has written and lectured about Abraham Lincoln and American history.

In 1972, Lehrman founded the Lehrman Institute, a public policy think tank in New York City which focused on the study of economic and foreign policy from a historical perspective. Lehrman and investor-philanthropist Richard Gilder, both former students at Yale University and members of Wolf's Head Society, went on to found the Gilder Lehrman Institute of American History and the Gilder Lehrman Collection of American historical documents in 1994. Lehrman has said that "the building of the collection was to get... documents... out of private hands and into a place where they could be serving American students [and] American teachers". They also founded the Lincoln and Soldiers Institute at Gettysburg College, which awards the Lincoln Prize "annually for the finest scholarly work in English on Abraham Lincoln, the American Civil War soldier, or a subject relating to their era", as well as the Gilder Lehrman Center for the Study of Slavery, Resistance and Abolition at Yale University, which awards the Frederick Douglass Prize for the best work in these fields.

"Over the last two generations our public and private schools have been eliminating civics classes and replacing the study of American history with social studies classes," Lehrman said in a newspaper interview. "In many American colleges today you can graduate with a degree without ever taking a full course in American history. I respect the fact that this is a free country... but I do not regard the ignorance of American history as a good thing." In a 2008 interview with Humanities magazine, Lehrman described the efforts he had begun with Gilder: "[W]e want history to be a public thing. Which is why Dick and I, working with Gabor Boritt, established the Lincoln Prize for the very best work on the era of Mr. Lincoln and the Civil War and, with David Davis, the Frederick Douglass Book Prize for the very best work on abolition, resistance, and slavery. We want to help attract the interest of the general public. And scholars and teachers should be honored for the immense effort they make to write and to study and to teach American history." The first prize was "announced on Feb. 12, 1991, the 182nd anniversary of Lincoln's birth, with subsequent prizes announced every year on his birthday eve, Feb. 11". The first Lincoln Prize recipient was film-maker Ken Burns for his Civil War series on PBS. Subsequent winners have included historians Michael Burlingame, Richard J. Carwardine, David H. Donald, Eric Foner, John Hope Franklin, Doris Kearns Goodwin, Allen C. Guelzo, James M. McPherson, James Oakes, and Douglas L. Wilson.

As a result of their conservative credentials, the support of Lehrman and Gilder for history projects was sometimes controversial. In 2005, David Brion Davis, a self-described "leftish Democrat" who worked with them at Yale University's Gilder Lehrman Center for the Study of Slavery, Resistance, and Abolition, defended them: "Despite our major political differences, I have never encountered even the most subtle attempt at ideological influence of any kind with respect to my teaching, writing, cocurating a national exhibition on slavery, or making proposals as a member of the Advisory Board of the Gilder Lehrman Institute of American History." In 2013, Lehrman published The American Founders, a collection of essays on the military and civilian leaders of the American Revolutionary War era. In 2017 and 2018, Lehrman published Churchill, Roosevelt & Company: Studies in Character and Statecraft, a book that examines how the special relationship between the United States and Great Britain cemented the alliance that won the war, and Lincoln & Churchill: Statesmen at War, a discourse about how Abraham Lincoln and Winston Churchill as commanders in chief led their respective nations to victory.

=== Lincoln Institute ===
Lehrman founded the Lincoln Institute to provide support and assistance to scholars and groups involved in the study of the life of Abraham Lincoln, the 16th President of the United States. The institute produces printed materials, broadcast products, conferences, and Internet resources on Lincoln. It also supports the development of historical materials and transcription of primary sources for research purposes.

The institute also produces and maintains six websites about Abraham Lincoln and the people with whom he lived and worked. In 2013, Lehrman published Lincoln "by littles," a collection of his essays on Lincoln and the Civil War.

== Conservative causes ==
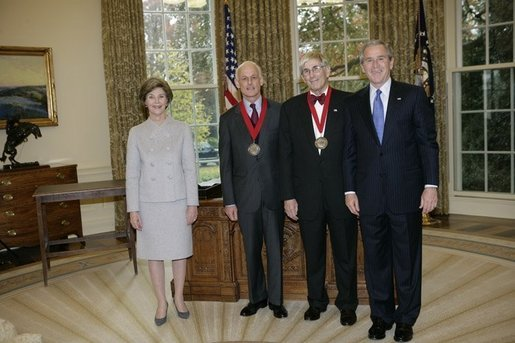
Lehrman with President George W. Bush, First Lady Laura Bush, and Richard Gilder in 2005

Lehrman was active in civic and conservative causes. He was a member of the board of directors of the Project for the New American Century for one year. In the late 1970s, he was a trustee at the American Enterprise Institute and was a trustee of The Heritage Foundation until the 1990s. He served as a trustee of the Manhattan Institute and the Pierpont Morgan Library.

In 1983, he helped to found Citizens for America, an organization that aided Oliver North's campaign to supply the anti-communist Contra guerrillas in Nicaragua. The impetus for the organization came from Jaquelin H. Hume, a friend of President Ronald Reagan, who had conceived the project and sold President Reagan on getting Lehrman involved. Reagan called Lehrman: "The President and I had a long talk. The conclusions of our discussion were very simple. We agree we needed a national civil league, an activist enterprise, people who agreed on first principles, that would focus on economic and national security policies. Our first purpose is to induce a mutation in the climate of opinion in America among opinion leaders. We would join the intellectual debate in every town, village, and city through our Congressional district committees." In his diary, Reagan wrote: "Lew Lehrman & Jack Hume came by. They have a great plan for getting our supporters organized at the Cong. District level."

At the time, Lehrman was considered a possible future Republican presidential candidate.

Political columnists Evans and Novak reported that Ronald Reagan considered naming Lehrman U.S. Secretary of the Treasury before selecting Donald T. Regan. In his memoirs, Regan wrote that he was urged to "placate my critics by appointing Lewis Lehrman, a prominent New York conservative, as Deputy Secretary of the Treasury". Regan did not want to do so, however, writing: "Although Lehrman was a capable, even a brilliant, man, I declined. I knew that he and I would clash because he would not be content to take a backseat. I wanted an administrator, not a person with policy objectives of his own." Lehrman was also considered for the post of Treasury Undersecretary for Monetary Affairs. Secretary Regan preferred monetarist Beryl Wayne Sprinkel. Unlike Sprinkel, Lehrman was critical of the floating exchange rate policies of Milton Friedman, the leading academic monetarist. Treasury Secretary Regan said he sought "the best monetarist I can get".

Lehrman wrote several memos for President-elect Reagan on monetary and fiscal policy, including "The Struggle for Financial Order at the Onset of the Reagan Presidency", and one co-authored by Congressmen David Stockman and Jack Kemp, "Avoiding a GOP Economic Dunkirk". Conservative columnists Rowland Evans and Robert Novak wrote that, "Stockman was deeply impressed by Lehrman's arguments and used them as the inspiration for his own more specific paper." Writing of the Lehrman memos, New York Times columnist Leonard Silk warned that if Lehrman was named to a Reagan Administration post, "this will point the direction in which the Reagan administration economic policy is moving. But it is not yet there and there is strong opposition among more traditional conservatives." With bank interest rates over 20 percent and annualized inflation rates approaching 15 percent, the economic emergency which Lehrman had first proposed and which had been subsequently endorsed by Stockman and Kemp was ultimately rejected.

In 1985, Citizens for America was run for a short time by future lobbyist and convict Jack Abramoff. Abramoff was later fired for mismanaging the organization's funds. During that year, Citizens for America sponsored a meeting in Angola between Angolan, Nicaraguan, Afghan, and Laotian anti-communist rebels. Lehrman personally attended the event, called the Democratic International. Lehrman stepped down from Citizens for America in September 1986 and was succeeded by Gerald P. Carmen, a U.S. former ambassador to Switzerland.

=== Gold standard advocacy ===
From very early on, Lehrman became an advocate of the gold standard, influenced by Jacques Rueff, Charles de Gaulle's finance minister. Lehrman was a member of the U.S. Gold Commission in 1981 with Congressman Ron Paul. In 1982, they co-authored the book The Case for Gold with a team of economists that included Murray Rothbard. Lehrman's writings on monetary policy appeared in periodicals, including The Wall Street Journal, The Washington Post, National Review, American Spectator, and The Weekly Standard. Additionally, Lehrman contributed to Money and the Coming World Order, originally published by the New York University Press and republished by The Lehrman Institute in 2012, and wrote The True Gold Standard (2012). In promoting a return to the Gold Standard, Lehrman was allied with James Grant, editor of Grant's Interest Rate Observer, with whom he testified before the United States House Financial Services Subcommittee on Domestic Monetary Policy and Technology in March 2011 and September 2012.

Lehrman launched the Gold Standard Now in 2011 as an aggregator of monetary policy news and to advocate that "America should lead by unilateral resumption of the gold standard." In 2013, Lehrman published Money, Gold and History, a collection of his writings on monetary policy and his advocacy of the gold standard.

He repeatedly argued that paper currency was injurious to working Americans. "The primary argument upon which I would rest my case for a gold standard," Lehrman said in a 2013 interview, "is that it preserves the purchasing power, the wages, the salaries, of all those who are unable to defend themselves in the halls of Congress in Washington or elsewhere, in citadels of power like Wall Street."

=== Lehrman American Studies Center ===
In 2005, with Lehrman's funding, the Intercollegiate Studies Institute established the Lehrman American Studies Center. According to the Intercollegiate Studies Institute, the center provided programming focused on American Studies, including academic conferences and educational resources. The center provided a variety of programming, including an annual two-week summer institute at Princeton University for young academics, and maintained an online library of teaching resources. "I learned at Yale how much can be gained from the close interaction of students with historians", Lehrman noted in a magazine interview. "We have tried to replicate that model at the Lehrman Institute, at the Gilder Lehrman Institute, and most recently with the Lehrman American Studies Center at ISI."

== Death ==
Lehrman died on March 11, 2026, at the age of 87, from Parkinson's disease.

Party political offices
Preceded by Perry B. Duryea Jr.	Republican Nominee for Governor of New York; 1982	Succeeded by Andrew O'Rourke
