= Dirico =

- Municipality
- Location in Angola
- Coordinates: 17°59′6″S 20°46′37″E
- Country: Angola
- Province: Cuando

Population (2014 Census)
  - Total: 15,126
- Time zone: UTC+1 (WAT)

Dirico is a municipality in Cuando Province in Angola. The municipality was estimated to have had a population of 19,191 in 2020. The municipality is subdivided into the communes of Dirico and Xamavera.

Dirico is served by Dirico Airport. It lies on the Cuito River near its confluence with the Cubango River.
