= Rivungo =

- Municipality
- Location in Angola
- Coordinates: 16°20′S 22°2′E
- Country: Angola
- Province: Cuando

Population (2014 Census)
  - Total: 33,053
- Time zone: UTC+1 (WAT)

Rivungo is a municipality in Cuando Province in Angola. It is situated on the Cuando River. The municipality had a population of 33,053 inhabitants in 2014.
