= Dima, Angola =

Coordinates: 15°47′S 21°32′E

Dima Neriquinha
- Municipality
- Location in Angola
- Country: Angola
- Province: Cuando
- Time zone: UTC+1 (WAT)
- Climate: Aw

Dima, formerly Neriquinha, is a municipality in Angola's Cuando Province. It formerly had the status of a commune under Rivungo until the Angolan administrative reforms of 2024.

The municipality is administratively organized into a commune-headquarters, equivalent to the city of Cunjamba, and also by the commune of Cutuile.
