= Cuando Province =

Province of Angola

Cuando
- Province
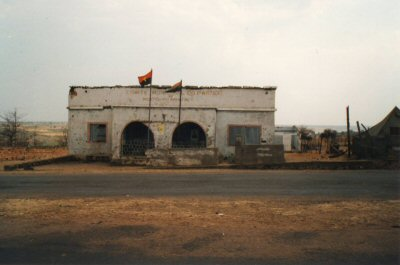
- Town hall of Cuito Cuanavale in 1998

- Coordinates: 16°S 20°E
- Country: Angola
- Established: 5 September 2024
- Capital: Mavinga

Government
  - Governor: Lúcio Gonçalves Amaral (MPLA)
  - Vice-Governor for Social and Economic Affairs: Andre Zinga Nkula
  - Vice-Governor for Technical Services and Infrastructure: Claudiosvaldo da Gloria Nunda Muhongo

Area
  - Total: 109,346 km^{2} (42,219 sq mi)

Population (2024)
  - Total: 138,770
  - Density: 1.2691/km^{2} (3.2869/sq mi)
- Time zone: UTC+1 (WAT)

Cuando is a province of Angola. It was created on 5 September 2024 from the eastern part of Cuando Cubango Province. Its capital is Mavinga.

== Geography and climate ==
Cuando borders the Angolan provinces of Cubango to the west and Moxico to the north. It also borders Zambia's Western Province to the east, and the Namibian regions of Zambezi and Kavango East to the southeast and south respectively. The province is drained by the Cubango and Cuando rivers. The Cubango forms part of the province's border with Namibia, and its tributary the Cuito River forms much of the province's border with Cubango Province. The Cuando River runs along or close to much of the province's borders with Moxico Province and Zambia.

Luengue-Luiana National Park and Mavinga National Park are located in the province. Both parks are components of the Kavango–Zambezi Transfrontier Conservation Area, the world's largest land-based transboundary protected area. The northern part of the province belongs to the dry miombo woodlands ecoregion, while the south falls in the Zambezian Baikiaea woodlands ecoregion.

Cuando's climate varies from tropical in the north to semi-arid in the south. Annual rainfall ranges from 1,200 mm (47 in) in the north to 600 mm (24 in) in the south.

== History ==
Since at least 2016, there have been proposals to divide Cuando Cubango, formerly Angola's second largest province by area, into two smaller provinces. On 14 August 2024, Angola's National Assembly approved a law to create three new provinces, including the division of Cuando Cubango into the provinces of Cuando and Cubango. This law went into effect with its publication in the official gazette of Angola on 5 September 2024.

== Administration ==
Cuando is divided into the nine municipalities of Cuito Cuanavale, Dima, Dirico, Luengue, Luiana, Mavinga, Mucusso, Rivungo and Xipundo. Cuito Cuanavale is further subdivided into the communes of Cuito Cuanavale and Lupire; Dima is subdivided into the communes of Cunjamba and Cutuile; and Dirico is subdivided into the communes of Dirico and Xamavera.

The first governor of Cuando is Lúcio Gonçalves Amaral, who was appointed in December 2024.

== Demographics ==
The former communes that now make up the territory of Cuando reported a combined population of 98,419 in the 2014 Angolan census. A variety of languages are spoken in Cuando, with Nganguela being the most common.

== Economy ==
The main economic activity in Cuando is cattle, goat and sheep farming. Roads in the province have been in poor condition since the end of the Angolan Civil War, and the lack of transportation infrastructure impedes the economic development of the province.
