= Jamba, Cuando =

Town in Cuando Province, Angola

Coordinates: 17°27′21″S 22°36′47″E

Location of Jamba in Angola

Jamba is a town in Angola, located in the municipality of Luiana in the southeastern province of Cuando, just north of the Namibian border along the Caprivi Strip.

The town is best known as the former military headquarters of UNITA, a rebel movement supported by South Africa and the United States that fought the Soviet-aligned and supported government in the Angolan Civil War, a Cold War conflict.

== Etymology ==
The name Jamba means elephant in Umbundu, a language spoken in Southern Angola.

== UNITA headquarters ==
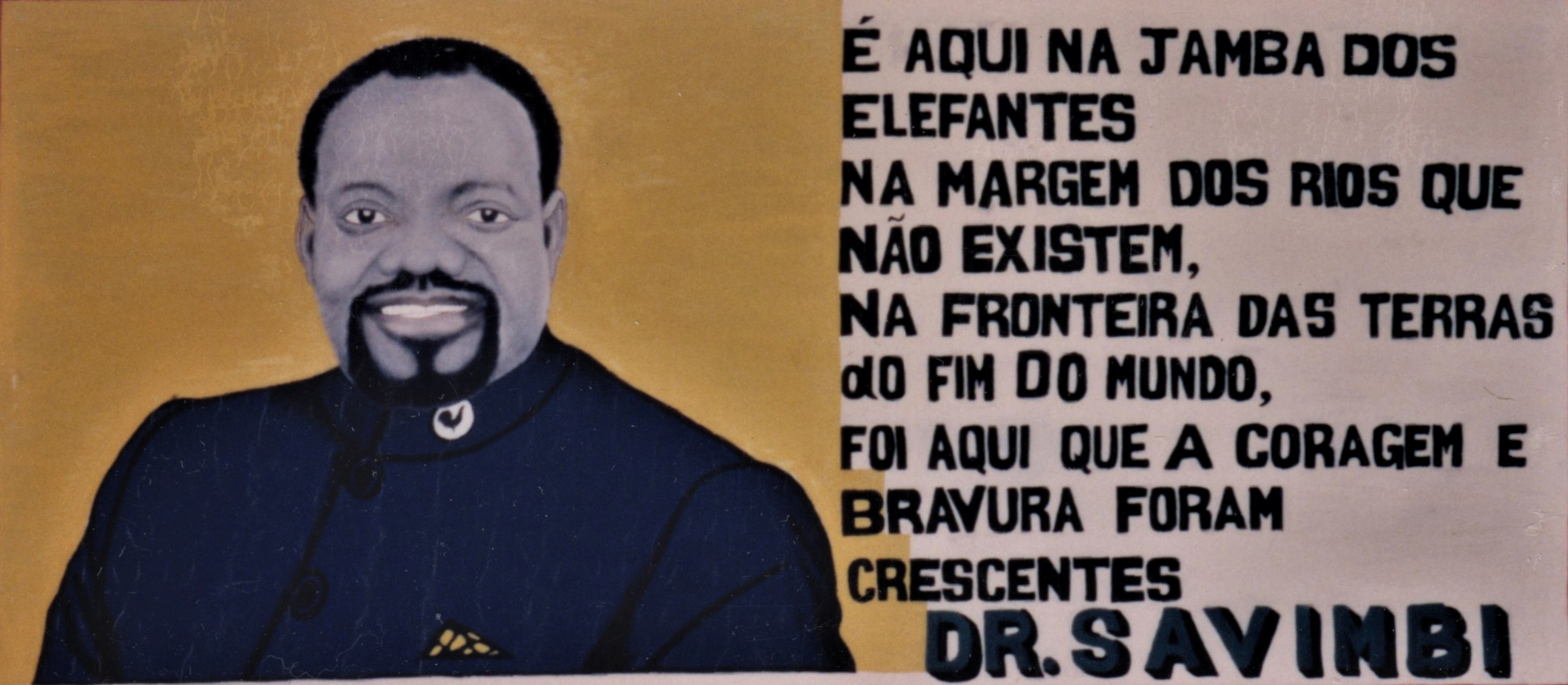
A billboard near the Jamba airstrip in 1995 showing Jonas Savimbi with the caption: "Here in Jamba of the elephants, on the banks of vanished rivers, on the frontier at the end of the earth, it was here that courage and bravery were bred."

Jamba served as UNITA's headquarters from 1976 until 1992. The headquarters itself was an elaborate military encampment with radar capabilities and sophisticated anti-aircraft weaponry that protected the headquarters throughout the 16-year Angolan Civil War. The strategic location of Jamba allowed for the easy establishment of supply lines between the city and Apartheid South Africa. UNITA also maintained a large military airstrip in Jamba.

Author Paul Hare described Jamba as "a spread out, well-organised guerrilla encampment, carefully planned and camouflaged to protect against air attacks".

On December 24, 1999, Jamba was captured by Angolan military forces.

=== Jonas Savimbi ===
UNITA was led by Jonas Savimbi, a charismatic political and military leader who is generally considered one of the more important figures in the history of Angola. Savimbi forged relations with the U.S. and ultimately became an important proxy for the West during the Cold War.

Savimbi's critics allege that his military campaign was hugely costly and destructive to modern Angola and that, during the Civil War, human rights were violated by Savimbi and UNITA. Similar allegations were made against the government of Angola during the war.

== Jamba under UNITA ==
Under the U.S. administrations of Ronald Reagan and George H. W. Bush, Jamba grew as a major center of UNITA rebel activity, with the construction of elaborate air defense capabilities and runways designed for the replenishment of U.S. war supplies, which were shipped to UNITA. Both Zaire and South Africa cooperated with the U.S. in supporting Savimbi and UNITA in their war against the Marxist Angolan government.

In 1985, Jamba was the host of the Democratic International or "Jamba Jamboree", a meeting of global anti-communist insurgents organized by United States conservatives, including Jack Abramoff. At the conference, the participants signed a communiqué declaring "our solidarity with all freedom movements in the world and ... our commitment to cooperate to liberate our nations from the Soviet imperialists" Other participants in the conference included:

- Adolfo Calero, Contra leader
- Pa Kao Her, Laotian resistance leader
- Lewis Lehrman, American businessman and politician
- Abdurrahim Wardak, Afghan mujahideen leader
- Jack Wheeler, American conservative

In later years, Savimbi was visited regularly in Jamba by some of his closest American advisors and advocates, including Michael Johns, Grover Norquist, and others.

=== Reagan doctrine ===
The policy of support for anti-communist resistance movements, which was supported by The Heritage Foundation and other influential conservatives, ultimately came to be known as the Reagan Doctrine and was a central component of the foreign policies of the Reagan and (to a lesser extent) George H. W. Bush administrations.

== In popular culture ==
In Call of Duty: Black Ops II, Jamba was the staging point where Jonas Savimbi starts his counterattack on MPLA forces while being aided by CIA agents Hudson and Mason while the agents are searching for a squad gone MIA (Missing In Action).
