= Cuchi =

Municipality in Angola

- Municipality
- Location in Angola
- Coordinates: 14°39′S 16°54′E
- Country: Angola
- Province: Cubango

Population (2014 Census)
  - Municipality: 42,974
  - Urban: 15,000
- Time zone: UTC+1 (WAT)

Cuchi is a municipality in Cubango Province in Angola. The population of the municipality was 42,974 in 2014.

== Transport ==
It is served by a station on the southern main line of South Angolan Railways.

== Climate ==
Average annual temperatures range from −2 to 18 °C.

== See also ==
- Railway stations in Angola
