= Mavinga =

- Municipality
- Location in Angola
- Coordinates: 16°0′S 20°0′E
- Country: Angola
- Province: Cuando

Area
  - Municipality: 44.347 km^{2} (17.122 sq mi)

Population (2014 Census)
  - Municipality: 27,196
  - Urban: 10,000
- Time zone: UTC+1 (WAT)

Mavinga is a municipality in Angola, and the capital of Cuando Province since that province's creation in 2024. It is one of the three municipalities in Angola whose inhabitants are predominantly Mbunda. The municipality had a population of 27,196 in 2014. Previously Mavinga was part of Cuando Cubango Province, when it comprised the communes of Mavinga, Cunjamba/Dime, Cutuile and Luengue.

== See also ==
- Luengué Hunting Reserve
- Mbunda language
- Mbunda people
