= Menongue =

Menongue Serpa Pinto
- Municipality
- Location in Angola
- Coordinates: 14°39′20″S 17°41′03″E
- Country: Angola
- Province: Cubango

Area
  - Municipality: 23,500 km^{2} (9,100 sq mi)
- Elevation: 1,354 m (4,442 ft)

Population (2014)
  - Municipality: 320,914
  - Density: 13.7/km^{2} (35.4/sq mi)
  - Urban: 251,178
- Time zone: UTC+1 (WAT)
- Climate: Cwa

Menongue, formerly Serpa Pinto, is a municipality and the capital of Cubango Province in Angola. The municipality had a population of 320,914 in 2014. It is one of the four municipalities in Angola whose inhabitants are predominantly Mbunda.

Menongue is the current terminus of the Moçâmedes Railway, from Moçâmedes, and also home of the small Menongue Airport.

== History ==
During the colonial period, the town was called Serpa Pinto, in honour of the namesake Portuguese explorer.

Menongue was formerly the capital of Cuando Cubango Province, until it was divided into the provinces of Cuando and Cubango in 2024.

== Sports ==
FC Cuando Cubango, promoted to the 2018 Girabola, the top flight of Angolan soccer, play in Menongue.

== See also ==
- Mbunda language
- Mbunda people
- Mbunda Kingdom
