= Provinces of Angola =

Map of the twenty-one provinces of Angola

Angola is divided into twenty-one provinces, known in Portuguese as províncias. On 14 August 2024, Angola's National Assembly approved a law to create three new provinces:

- Cuando Cubango Province was divided into Cuando Province and Cubango Province;
- Icolo e Bengo Province was separated from Luanda Province; and
- Moxico Leste Province was separated from Moxico Province.

This law went into effect with its publication in the official gazette of Angola on 5 September 2024, and are expected to become operational in 2025. The current provinces are tabulated below:

Location	Province	Capital	Area (km^{2})	Population (2024)	Population density (per km^{2} in 2022)
	Bengo	Caxito	20,300	716,335	35.29
	Benguela	Benguela	39,124	2,597,638	66.40
	Bié	Cuíto	70,745	2,264,874	32.01
	Cabinda	Cabinda	7,290	903,370	123.92
	Cuando	Mavinga	109,346	138,770	1.27
	Cuanza Norte	N'dalatando	20,426	659,097	32.27
	Cuanza Sul	Sumbe	55,554	2,327,981	41.90
	Cubango	Menongue	91,466	570,447	6.24
	Cunene	Ondjiva	77,156	1,806,417	23.41
	Huambo	Huambo	33,296	2,691,902	80.85
	Huíla	Lubango	78,897	3,302,866	41.86
	Icolo e Bengo	Catete	17,223	1,372,670	79.65
	Luanda	Luanda	1,655	8,816,297	5327.07
	Lunda Norte	Dundo	99,197	1,742,217	17.56
	Lunda Sul	Saurimo	82,443	893,936	10.84
	Malanje	Malanje	87,136	1,298,250	14.90
	Moxico	Luena	126,432	574,253	4.54
	Moxico Leste	Cazombo	75,421	411,074	5.45
	Namibe	Moçâmedes	57,170	815,708	14.27
	Uíge	Uíge	62,920	2,017,921	32.07
	Zaire	M'banza-Kongo	37,327	682,658	18.29

== See also ==
- List of provinces of Angola by Human Development Index
- Municipalities of Angola
- Communes of Angola
- ISO 3166-2:AO, the ISO codes for Angola.

== Bibliography ==
- Gwillim Law (1999). "Angola". Administrative Subdivisions of Countries: A Comprehensive World Reference, 1900 through 1998. US: McFarland & Company. pp. 27–29. ISBN 0786407298.
