= Operation Saluting October =

1987 FAPLA offensive in the Angolan Civil War

- Part of Battle of Cuito Cuanavale
- Map depicting FAPLA and South African/FALA troop movements during Operation Saluting October and Operation Moduler
- Planned by: Pyotr Gusev; Ivan Ryabchenko
- Objective: Capture of Mavinga
- Date: July 12 - October 7, 1987
- Executed by: People's Armed Forces of Liberation of Angola (FAPLA)
- Outcome: FAPLA objectives failed; offensive stalls at Lomba River; South Africa launches Operation Moduler to halt the offensive

Operation Saluting October (Portuguese: Operação Saudemos Outubro, alternatively translated as Operation Salute to October) was an offensive carried out by the People's Armed Forces of Liberation of Angola (FAPLA) against the National Union for the Total Independence of Angola (UNITA) and its armed wing, the Armed Forces of the Liberation of Angola (FALA), during the Angolan Civil War. The preliminary phase of the operation commenced in July 1987. The principal FAPLA objective was to advance two hundred kilometres from its bases at Cuito Cuanavale to seize the strategically vital FALA logistics centre at Mavinga. In the meantime, a number of secondary movements towards the smaller FALA-held settlements of Cangamba and Cassamba were initiated to draw FALA troops away from Mavinga. The capture of Mavinga was projected to cause the collapse of FALA's entire southeastern front, and pave the way for a second offensive on UNITA's political and military headquarters at Jamba. "Saluting October" was a reference to the seventieth anniversary of the Russian October Revolution.

Eight FAPLA combined arms brigades, supported by Soviet logistical personnel and advisers, as well as Soviet and Cuban pilots based out of Menongue, participated in the operation. FAPLA's 47, 16, 21, and 59 Brigades spearheaded the offensive, while 8, 13, 25, and 66 Brigades formed the rearguard and defended the increasingly lengthy supply lines needed to support the four leading brigades. Saluting October triggered an immediate military response from South Africa, which launched Operation Moduler to halt the offensive. In late September 1987, the FAPLA advance stalled short of Mavinga at the Lomba River, where the leading brigades encountered strong resistance from a South African expeditionary force deployed to aid FALA. Saluting October ended on October 7, when all participating FAPLA units were ordered to withdraw towards Cuito Cuanavale.

== Background ==
Operation Saluting October was planned by Lieutenant General Pyotr Gusev, commander of the Soviet military mission in Angola. It was modeled after Operation Second Congress, a similar unsuccessful offensive towards Mavinga planned by Colonel General Konstantin Kurochkin in 1985. Kurochkin was the former head of the Soviet mission and remained the primary liaison between Gusev and the Soviet Ministry of Defence. He was greatly supportive of Gusev's plans and personally flew to Angola in June 1987 to endorse Saluting October before the Angolan government and the FAPLA general staff. Kurochkin and others in the Soviet Ministry of Defence were also instrumental in persuading Mikhail Gorbachev, General Secretary of the Communist Party of the Soviet Union, to approve extensive funding for Saluting October. Gorbachev was then slashing defence spending, and looking to reduce the enormous open-ended commitment of Soviet military aid to Angola in particular. However, he agreed to approve the funds and materiel to support FAPLA operations for one more year. This decision was apparently made after consultations between the Angolan and Soviet political leadership in March 1987. Thereafter, the Soviet Union transported approximately $1 billion USD worth of military hardware to Angola in a massive airlift carried out with Antonov An-24 cargo aircraft, with as many as twelve per day landing in Luanda just prior to Saluting October. This equipment was then offloaded and picked up by Angolan Ilyushin Il-76s, which in turn flew them directly to FAPLA's staging areas. The deliveries from the Soviet Union included large numbers of tanks and armoured personnel carriers recently withdrawn from its own military campaign in Afghanistan. These were initially rotated out to Tashkent and from there flown directly to Luanda by the AN-24s. American diplomat Chester Crocker described this movement of materiel as "Moscow's largest logistical effort to date in Angola", involving over a thousand Soviet military personnel. The influx of hardware in 1987 was accompanied by a notable increase in the number of advisers, pilots, and security troops attached to the Soviet military mission.

Orchestrating the capture of Mavinga had been the prime objective of the Soviet military mission since the early 1980s. The town itself had been largely destroyed and abandoned during the early years of the civil war, but it was also the site of the largest airfield under FALA's control. The airstrip at Mavinga was one of the few in the country that could accommodate heavy lift aircraft carrying supplies and weapons from UNITA's two major external allies, South Africa and the United States. The Central Intelligence Agency (CIA) routinely kept FALA resupplied this way, via covert flights out of Kamina in neighbouring Zaire. Mavinga was also the centre of a vast smuggling operation involving illegally mined kimberlite and other resources, which FALA used to help finance its war effort. If Mavinga fell, FALA would lose this vital logistics lifeline, and FAPLA would be able to rapidly airlift more troops and equipment into the region, in close proximity to the UNITA political and military headquarters at Jamba. The FAPLA general staff hoped this in turn would allow them to concentrate more forces around Mavinga for an offensive on Jamba, which would ideally be scheduled the following year, between June and September 1988.

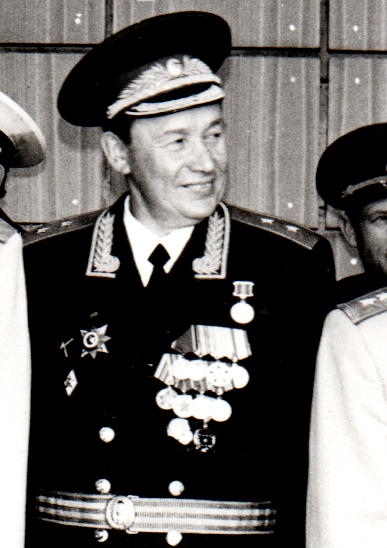
Lieutenant General Pyotr Gusev in Berlin, 1982.

Aside from the capture of Mavinga, secondary objectives of Saluting October included disrupting FALA's insurgency in central Angola, and expanding the coverage provided by FAPLA's strategic air defence network to the extremities of the country's southern and eastern borders. It was hoped that the offensive would give FAPLA forces in the rear an opportunity to regain the initiative while FALA was distracted by the threat to its logistics lifeline.

Crocker observed that "it was the Soviets who pushed this offensive; they had the influence to prevail in allied decision-making since they paid the bills and provided the hardware. More precisely, it was the Soviet military and Communist Party hardliners who wanted the offensive," intent on ensuring a final decisive victory for their FAPLA ally. In public exchanges with their Western counterparts, Soviet officials were supportive of a negotiated end to the Angolan conflict, but privately they urged the Angolan government of the need to secure a unilateral military solution as soon as possible. Kenyan historian Gilbert Khadiagala wrote that both the Soviet and Angolan political leadership were seduced by the idea of a quick, definitive military solution, and by July 1987, had become increasingly unwilling to engage with an American initiative led by Crocker aimed at securing peace talks with UNITA. Indeed, Moroccan political scientist Zaki Laidi pointed out that Soviet hardliners had always been opposed to American diplomatic initiatives in Angola, and their enormous contribution of military aid was partly to dissuade the Angolans from ruling out a battlefield solution in favour of a "regional settlement sponsored by the United States".

According to Victoria Brittain, a journalist for The Guardian, Crocker's "briefings to journalists that summer described Cuba and the Soviet Union as being, like Angola, determined to go for a military solution against UNITA." However, Brittain asserts that the Angolan government rejected the notion of peace talks mediated by the US because Crocker was unwilling to discuss ending American military aid to FALA. The continued assurance of American support also encouraged UNITA to be uncompromising in its demands for peace on its terms.

A CIA white paper commented on "Moscow's determination to see the struggle through without compromise with UNITA," and found that the Soviet government had adopted a "hard line of opposing reconciliation under any circumstances other than UNITA's surrender." The agency assessed that most Angolan political leaders believed "they can avoid talks through a military victory," and prominent FAPLA generals were "seemingly enthralled by the military hardware FAPLA continues to acquire, and....assume that it will eventually prove decisive against UNITA."

The head of operations for the FAPLA general staff, General Roberto Leal Monteiro, stated that the government was not discarding the notion of peace talks altogether, but wished to revisit them later from a position of military strength. According to Monteiro, Saluting October was approved partly because dos Santos believed that a successful offensive on Mavinga would give him considerably more leverage at the negotiating table.

Political scientist Jeffrey Herbst attributed dos Santos's decision to pursue the offensive to the fact that UNITA leader Jonas Savimbi had recently secured a commitment of $15 million in military aid from the US, making it desirable to inflict a major defeat on FALA before it could be further strengthened by American funding and materiel.

In his analysis of the Angolan government's decision to greenlight Saluting October, American journalist Karl Maier claimed that "the idea of wiping out UNITA had been an obsession ever since the [Angolan leadership] took control of Luanda at independence in November 1975, and the mirage of total victory had clouded the leaders' vision" to tactical realities on the ground.

Previous FAPLA offensives towards Mavinga had been unsuccessful, which Soviet advisers blamed on shortages of equipment, improper reconnaissance, and failure to safeguard the rear of the units involved. Consequently, Saluting October was to integrate more heavy armour and artillery with the FAPLA infantry, and the Soviets devoted more resources to training Angolan reconnaissance troops and combat engineers. As a result, three new independent reconnaissance battalions were formed for the purposes of screening the advance. FAPLA was also supplied with more sophisticated bridging equipment.

The outlined offensive relied heavily on the logistical and technical support provided by Soviet advisers attached to FAPLA on the company level. The advisers were expected to accompany their Angolan counterparts during battlefield engagements, although this was contrary to the official stance espoused by the Soviet government. Unofficially, the decision on what extent the advisers should be involved in hostilities was left to the discretion of the FAPLA and Soviet command hierarchy in Angola. Pilots and air crews from the Soviet Air Forces would also provide support for the ground operations. Sovietologist Peter Vanneman wrote that "the evidence of Soviet pilots participating [in Saluting October] is substantial, including eyewitness reports and taped conversations of the pilots." The Soviet Foreign Ministry publicly stated that Soviet helicopter pilots and air crews would be available to support the FAPLA offensive, but denied they would take direct part in hostilities. There were a number of East German military advisers attached to the units involved as well, fulfilling various non-combat roles. Russian historians Gennady Shubin and Andrei Tokarev wrote:

Although the government of the USSR declared that the Soviet military did not participate in the battles in Angola, this operation was record-breaking in the number of Soviet military advisers, specialists, and interpreters who took part in it. Along the whole front, along the line of contact with the enemy, in the combat units of Angolan brigades and at the frontline command posts of the front, districts, and military zones, there were Soviet military advisers. They were there despite the battles, artillery shellings, and bombardments.

On the personal orders of Fidel Castro, Cuban combat forces - then present in large numbers in Angola to shore up FAPLA's counter-insurgency efforts - were explicitly forbidden from participating in Saluting October. Cuban disagreements with the Soviet and FAPLA general staff in the past had resulted in much of the support roles during Soviet-directed FAPLA offensives being filled by East German advisers instead. However, the East German National People's Army was uninterested in contributing regular ground troops to fully replace the role of Cuban combat formations, claiming that this would not make up for FAPLA's deficiencies. The East German advisers attached to the FAPLA brigades were primarily engaged in signals intelligence; their task was to monitor FALA and South African radio traffic in the operational area. The remainder were technicians who serviced and maintained the electronic equipment in the air defence systems.

"Don't get into such wasting, costly, and finally pointless offensives," Castro vented to Gusev's staff. "And count us out if you do." In his work Cuba, Africa, and Apartheid's End, Isaac Saney declared that this "reflected not only Cuban non-participation in, but also serious disagreement on the viability of the military operation...the planning of the offensive exposed the different perspectives that existed between Soviet and Cuban military advisers." Castro and the Cuban general staff opposed Saluting October on the grounds that FAPLA was being forced to adopt tactics more applicable to Soviet conventional operations in central Europe than an offensive against an irregular fighting force on the broken African terrain. Per Saney, "Cuban military advisers argued that Moscow did not appreciate the differences between Africa and Europe...Castro stated that Moscow adopted an 'academic concept' rather than a realistic appraisal of what was required in Angola." Gusev and his chief of staff, Ivan Ryabchenko, had planned Operation Saluting October based on their experiences moving similarly sized units in the Soviet Union, and had failed to take into account the logistical disadvantages and technical shortcomings of the FAPLA forces involved. Their emphasis was on concentrating large numbers of troops and materiel, then directing these concentrations against fixed targets–an approach the Cubans argued was "neither suitable nor applicable to Angola", where maximum mobility and flexibility were demanded.

Cuban opposition to Saluting October increased as preparations continued throughout 1987. Castro complained the Soviets still "believed they were fighting the Battle of Berlin, with Zhukov in command...they did not understand...the theatre of the fight and the kind of war we had to fight in this scenario." Once the Soviet and FAPLA preparations became public, Cuban diplomats took the unprecedented step of publicly criticising the planned offensive to the international press, and reiterating on several occasions that their military forces would not take part in it.

To FAPLA, the experience of planning and executing an operation of such massive proportions was relatively new, but the Soviet military mission was convinced that a decade of exhaustive training on its part had created an army capable of undertaking a complex multi-divisional offensive.

=== Foreign intelligence leaks and assessments ===
The South African government learned of Operation Saluting October as early as March 1987. At the beginning of the year, Angolan President José Eduardo dos Santos had written a letter to sympathetic lobbyists in the US, asking them to prepare statements in light of an upcoming new offensive against FALA. The contents of the letter were later leaked to South African officials, making them aware of Saluting October several months before the FAPLA preparations became public knowledge. Colonel Anatoly Polozok, a military attaché at the Soviet embassy in Botswana, separately passed details of Gusev's plans to South Africa's National Intelligence Service. Polozok reported the Cubans' growing opposition to Saluting October as well. This information was promptly shared with the US and UNITA. Piet Nortje observes that despite the South African warnings, UNITA "chose to ignore the danger for some months," making little preparations of its own until the FAPLA buildup was obvious.

The US government had learned of Operation Saluting October by April 1987. Aside from information received from South African sources, American officials were keenly monitoring Gorbachev's airlift of materiel to Luanda, as well as its rapid transfer to FAPLA's forward operating bases.

Chester Crocker noted that according to his sources, the Soviet military mission favoured a large offensive because they had assigned undue relevance to static objectives on their maps that held little tactical significance. In reality, Crocker wrote, "this was a low-intensity bush war spread across a vast country where high-value targets were scarce. The key military resources were reliable people and the capability for sustained and rapid maneuver. Soviet-led FAPLA offensives bore little relation to Angolan conditions." The United States Department of Defense was reportedly baffled by the decision to launch such a complex offensive better suited for the European theatre, concluding that "the Soviets have developed no specific doctrine to deal with the insurgency in Angola," and had little recourse other than conventional military tactics.

The CIA evaluated that a slow-moving and cautious FAPLA offensive involving multiple brigades would take advantage of FAPLA's "traditional strengths in firepower, air power, equipment, and numbers." It also pointed out that FAPLA would be largely road-bound, and when operating in areas where the road network was limited or nonexistent, the advance would be "channeled along a narrow frontage leaving the insurgents free use of interior areas." Furthermore, the CIA had confidence in FALA's ability to blunt the FAPLA advantage in armour and aircraft using recently supplied anti-tank missiles and MANPADs. The agency's analysts predicted that if "the insurgents were to be in serious danger, the South Africans would probably directly intervene in the combat to the extent necessary to remove the immediate threat." The CIA notably did not consider this a successful outcome, as it was likely to raise the risk of escalation by Cuba and the Soviet Union. According to its reports, a more successful outcome would be if FALA were to score an independent victory without the need for major South African intervention. This could potentially be accomplished by increasing guerrilla attacks in other parts of the country while simultaneously stalling the offensive through attacks on the overextended FAPLA supply lines. If the pressure on FAPLA's rear became too great, the CIA judged that Luanda would abandon the offensive rather than risk allowing its forces to become pinned down short of Mavinga.

== FAPLA buildup ==
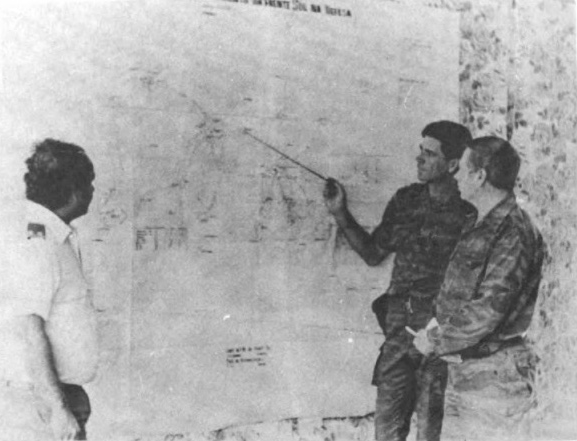
Soviet advisers planning operations in southern Angola, 1980s.

Preparations for Operation Saluting October commenced in April 1987. The offensive was to involve two FAPLA divisions composed of eight brigades staged around Cuito Cuanavale, for a total of 10,000-11,000 troops, 150 T-54/55 and T-62 main battle tanks, 30 PT-76 light tanks, and several organic batteries of M-46 and D-30 towed howitzers. In total, the force had around 500 armoured fighting vehicles. These were essentially motorised infantry brigades transported by truck and BTR-60PB armoured personnel carriers, each with an attached tank company, an armoured reconnaissance company, and six batteries of towed artillery. The decision to rely on motorised infantry mounted in wheeled vehicles was deliberate, as Soviet tracked vehicles experienced difficulties in the sandy soils of eastern Angola. Standard Soviet military tracks were simply not designed for the terrain in this region, and specialised tracks were required to achieve the most optimal off-road movement. This would prove to be a serious tactical disadvantage for the FAPLA tanks, and was a major factor in keeping them road-bound wherever possible.

The enormous fleet of trucks required to carry the infantry and supplies were primarily Brazilian Engesa 4X4 EE-15s, as well as the larger 6X6 EE-25s and EE-50s, which FAPLA had acquired in large numbers the previous year. These trucks were not held in high regard by FAPLA's Soviet advisers, who considered them primitive and unreliable. FAPLA also used various models of older Soviet trucks and East German IFA W 50s, which had more powerful engines and better off-road performance.

The FAPLA 47, 16, 21, and 59 Brigades were to spearhead the offensive on Mavinga. The FAPLA 8, 13, 25, and 66 Brigades provided security for the rear areas of the main offensive as it progressed, including guarding the lengthy supply lines needed to keep the front-line brigades in the field. Gusev believed this would prevent the leading brigades from being encircled. Previous offensives had also failed due to successful FALA attacks on FAPLA's extended supply lines, cutting the advancing units off from their logistics bases. Using half the force to provide rear security was thus perceived as essential. 8 Brigade's sole task was to provide security for the supply convoys between Menongue and Cuito Cuanavale, while 25 Brigade provided security for the supply convoys from Cuito Cuanavale to the front. 13 Brigade provided security for the forward staging areas at Cuito Cuanavale. 24 Brigade was held back as a mobile reserve, and 66 Brigade's objective was to secure the bridgeheads behind the four leading FAPLA brigades after they had successfully carried out their river crossings.

Also deployed to the operational area was the FAPLA 52 Air Defence Brigade, equipped with six 9K33 Osa air defence systems. Two of the 52 AD Brigade's 9K33 Osa batteries were deployed with the leading brigades, and another two with the rearmost brigades. The remaining two were positioned around Cuito Cuanavale to protect the airfield and staging areas there. They were supplemented in this role by at least one battery of S-125 Pechoras, which were notably placed under the direct control of the Soviet military mission rather than FAPLA. Technical support for the air defence equipment was provided by the East German military mission. An East German security contingent was also detailed to guard the fixed radar installations at Cuito Cuanavale against potential FALA sabotage efforts.

The size of the collective FAPLA force deployed in Saluting October was noticeably smaller than that organized for the abortive Operation Second Congress. However, on the whole it was composed of units that were considerably better equipped and trained than those that had taken part in the previous offensive.

Air support for the offensive was provided by two squadrons of FAPLA's 25th Aviation Combat Regiment, based in Menongue. Despite Castro's moratorium on the involvement of Cuban ground forces, Cuban fighter pilots were allowed to fly reconnaissance missions for FAPLA, as well as escort the IL-76 flights and truck convoys bringing supplies to the front. Ground attack and strike missions generally remained the responsibility of Angolan pilots. On August 30, six Cuban pilots arrived in Menongue to begin flying reconnaissance missions in support of Saluting October. They were also permitted to fly escort for their Angolan counterparts, who were primarily focused on ground attack and strike missions. As the campaign intensified, Soviet fighter pilots participated in these missions as well. To keep the extent of their involvement covert, the Soviet pilots operating out of Menongue often logged their operational sorties as training flights.

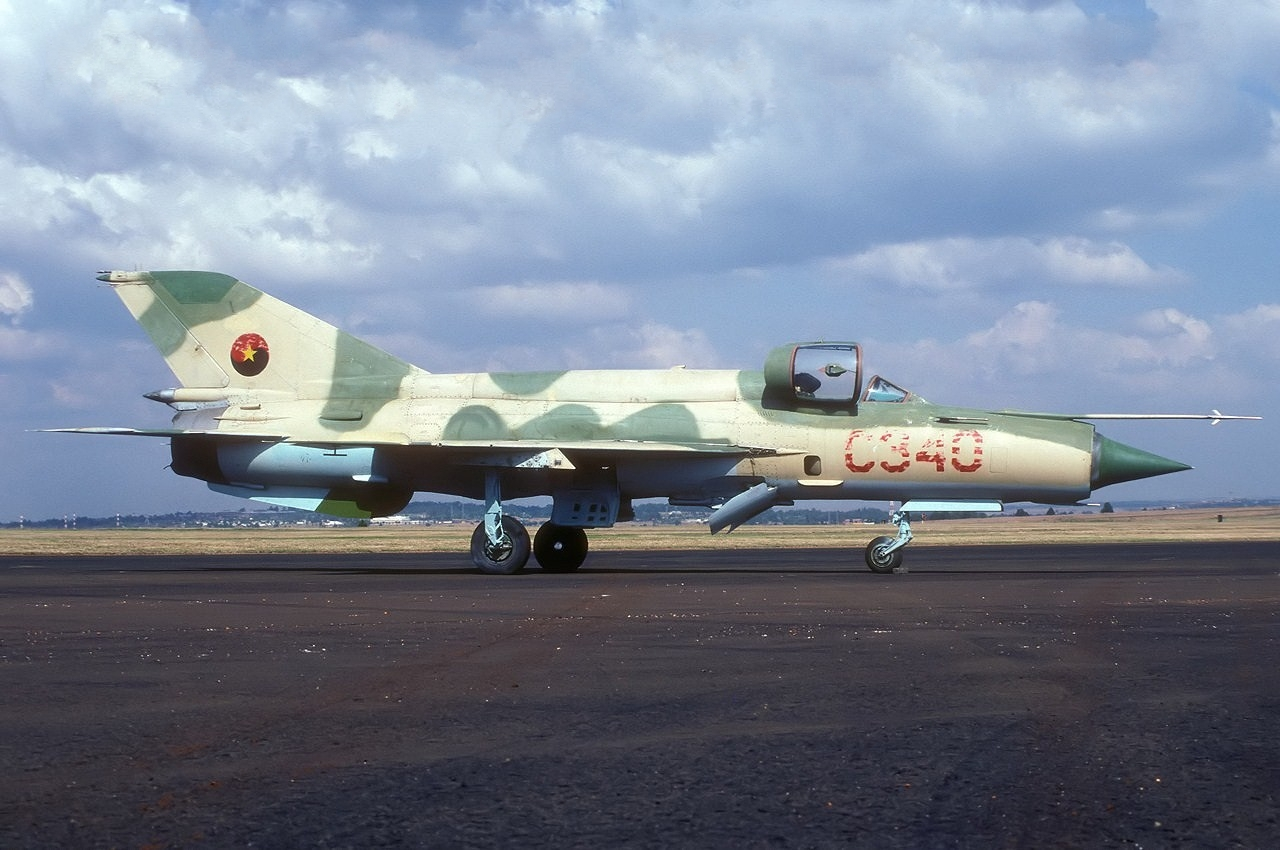
FAPLA MiG-21bis fighter of the 25th Aviation Combat Regiment. These were used for ground attack missions.

FAPLA had supported its ground forces heavily with Mil Mi-25/35 attack helicopters and armed Mil Mi-17 transport helicopters during Second Congress. Nevertheless, few helicopters appeared in the order of battle for Saluting October. Two Mi-17s and Mi-35s were used for patrol duties in the rear, and other Mi-17s were on standby for casualty evacuation and search and rescue operations. These were often operated by Soviet, Cuban, and the occasional East German pilots and aircrew. Due to the heavy losses of helicopters to FALA ground fire during Second Congress, the FAPLA general staff was reluctant to deploy them in large numbers. FAPLA had lost almost its entire original fleet of Mi-25/35s by the end of 1985; although new replacements had been delivered by the Soviet Union in 1986, the general staff did not authorise their deployment in combat missions again until October 1987, when Saluting October was already nearing its end.

Aside from the FAPLA regular forces, uMkhonto weSizwe (MK), the armed wing of the African National Congress (ANC), was enlisted to provide security for supply convoys. MK militants were also ordered to carry out small diversionary attacks on FALA forces north of Cuito Cuanavale to prevent them from shifting south to reinforce Mavinga. Medical support for these operations was provided by the East German government, which frequently airlifted wounded MK personnel from Angola to its own hospitals for treatment. South African historian Maren Saeboe wrote that "as a conventional military force MK was hardly a solid defence line. But the guarding of convoys and trains was crucial to keeping supply lines open both for civilians and military personnel." About 900 MK militants were mustered to assist FAPLA with security duties, although none played a major role in the offensive itself.

Shortly after the FAPLA buildup became apparent, UNITA announced its renewed willingness to reach a negotiated settlement with the Angolan government. As a precondition to peace talks, UNITA offered to reopen the section of the Benguela railway under its control, and allow the normal traffic of freight to resume. In early June 1987, Angolan Foreign Minister Afonso Van-Dúnem agreed in principle to this proposal, but the government later reversed its decision. While the Angolan leadership was dismayed by the disruption to trade, and was willing to consider an indirect agreement with UNITA to keep the Benguela line secure, it was not willing to accede to UNITA's demands for a nationwide ceasefire. When it became clear that further bargaining was futile, UNITA requested more military aid from the US to stave off the upcoming offensive. "It is a question of life or death for UNITA," Savimbi commented in an interview with Western journalists. "On their side, it is a question of lose and start to negotiate. On our side, it is lose and disappear."

The eight FAPLA brigades were assembled in their forward operating areas around Cuito Cuanavale by mid-July. However, most of the month was spent clearing out local FALA resistance from the area. Consequently, the 47, 16, 21, and 59 Brigades moved out of Cuito Cuanavale and began their advance towards Mavinga well behind schedule, on August 14. The infantry advanced on foot and mounted in BTR-60PBs and Engesa trucks, sweeping for FALA insurgents. The tanks were located at the rear. The four leading brigades advanced in dispersed box-like formations covering between five and eight square kilometres each, with the mechanised troops concentrated in the centre and dismounted infantry on the flanks. 16 Brigade occupied the eastern flank of the offensive, 21 Brigade occupied the centre, and 47 and 59 Brigades underpinned the western flank.

Gusev's plan called for 47 and 59 Brigades to approach Mavinga from an easterly direction, while 16 and 21 Brigades advanced from the north, enveloping the FALA forces between Cuito Cuanavale and Mavinga in a pincer movement. The objective of this double envelopment was to eliminate the FALA presence west of Mavinga, leaving the town vulnerable. Once the main body of the FALA force was dealt with, the brigades would collectively advance eastwards, hopefully turning the flank of the FALA defenses at Mavinga. According to the Soviet projections, the four brigades would be able to reach and capture Mavinga by the end of September. The FAPLA brigade commanders had repeatedly expressed reservations about splitting the force and fighting on two fronts, arguing that a single assault on Mavinga would be more linear and sufficient.

Prior to the primary offensive, a large FAPLA force massed at Lucusse carried out a feint action towards the settlements of Cassamba and Cangamba, intending to draw FALA away from Mavinga. This feint involved FAPLA's 3, 39, 43, and 54 Brigades. The brigades began their movements in July, and had secured most of their objectives by early August. They then returned to Lucusse.

== FAPLA offensive ==
=== Preliminary advances, July—August ===
The FAPLA offensive was initially successful but also proceeded at an extremely slow pace. The tanks and other armoured fighting vehicles in particular were slowed by the ruggedness of the terrain, and the challenge of navigating through extremely dense foliage. To complicate matters, this resulted in the armour consuming excessive quantities of fuel to cover short distances; Gusev and Ryabchenko had failed to take this possibility into account and had severely underestimated the amount of fuel needed for the offensive. The massive fuel consumption was amplified by the fact that many FAPLA crews kept their vehicles running all night, in case they needed to mobilise quickly against an insurgent raid. The offensive was further slowed by the brigades' orders to stay within the effective air defence umbrella of the 9K33 Osa systems, which were being constantly re-positioned to cover their advance. Within the first two weeks, the four leading brigades had already suffered 63 dead and 198 wounded, in addition to the loss of 5 trucks and a piece of mobile bridging equipment. The four supporting brigades had also suffered another 145 dead as a result of frequent FALA attacks on supply convoys around Cuito Cuanavale.

FAPLA's new Engesa trucks experienced problems with their clutches slipping as they fought for traction in the sandy soil, causing frequent breakdowns. Their suspension was also frequently damaged by the rough off-road conditions. As the number of breakdowns increased, FAPLA was forced to rely on an ever-dwindling number of older trucks, mostly Soviet Ural-4320s, not only to carry supplies but to tow their stricken vehicles. The alternative was simply to abandon the vehicle and its passengers while the rest of the unit moved on, leaving them easy targets for FALA. Due to the growing distance from its logistical hub at Cuito Cuanavale, FAPLA was forced to conduct most of its repairs in the field with a limited number of trained technicians and service personnel, and it could take days for the latter to locate the damaged vehicle in need of attention. The infantry involved in the offensive also advanced cautiously, covering just under 4 kilometres a day, and ceased all other activity in the late afternoon to construct elaborate defensive works. This would prove to be a fatal error, as it allowed FALA and its South African allies to compile detailed intelligence on their movements and make preparations for their own build-up to counter the offensive. Ronnie Kasrils, MK's intelligence chief, warned the Soviet staff that if Saluting October proceeded a South African counteroffensive was imminent. Gusev overruled the MK concerns, and the offensive continued without contingency plans for an intervention by South African ground forces.

FALA had seven battalions of varying strength and readiness dispersed between FAPLA and Mavinga, three of which were equipped with conventional heavy weapons. In total, they numbered around 8,000 insurgents. Their operations were coordinated by FALA General Arlindo Pena Ben-Ben from his field headquarters at Longa. These units frequently harassed the advancing FAPLA formations with hit and run attacks. Platoon or company-sized groups of insurgents would open fire with small arms, then disperse when the lead FAPLA elements counterattacked. Simultaneously, FALA spotters nearby would direct fire on the formation from mortars and Type 63 multiple rocket launchers. Occasionally they were joined by South African special forces teams, which ambushed the FAPLA armour with recoilless rifles and other shoulder-fired anti-tank weapons before displacing. 16 Brigade bore the brunt of these attacks, and by August 25 it had suffered 220 casualties. FALA inflicted enough damage on 16 Brigade that it remained well behind the other brigades as they continued towards Mavinga, leaving FAPLA's eastern flank exposed. FAPLA used the same routes of advance it had used during Operation Second Congress, making it remarkably easy for FALA to plan its ambushes. James Kiras, a military scholar who studied small unit operations during the Angolan conflict, wrote that the FAPLA brigades adhered to well-rehearsed "set march formations and response patterns", making them especially vulnerable to this type of asymmetric action.

South African historian Helmoed-Römer Heitman wrote that FALA was able to "maintain contact with the FAPLA brigades almost constantly...[they] were also able to predict the general direction of the movement of the FAPLA brigades. That enabled them to lay mines on the route, prepare dummy and mixed minefields, and set automatic ambushes (e.g. with Claymores) and manned ambushes." However, FALA's efforts to disrupt the advance were also hampered by the density of the vegetation, which made visibility and coordination on both sides extremely difficult. The CIA had previously judged that the large numbers of anti-tank guided missiles in FALA's possession would prove instrumental in halting the FAPLA offensive. However, these missiles, primarily the wire-guided MILAN, could not be guided accurately to their targets through the thick foliage cover.

Meanwhile, FAPLA began an aerial bombing campaign of Mavinga with Sukhoi Su-20M, MiG-21 and MiG-23ML strike aircraft launched from the airfields at Menongue and Cuito Cuanavale. These were armed with 250kg and 500kg high-explosive, incendiary, and cluster bombs. Due to the threat posed by FALA's FIM-92 Stinger missiles, however, the Angolan pilots often dropped their bombs from altitudes of up to 4,000 metres, limiting their accuracy. Consequently, they had to be guided to their targets by forward air controllers tracking their progress by radio and radar in Menongue. To make up for the inexperience and relatively small numbers of Angolan pilots, Soviet and Cuban pilots began to shoulder a greater burden of the strike missions on Mavinga as the offensive progressed.

In response to the increased air activity, FALA deployed eight Stinger teams to hunt the FAPLA aircraft. Four teams were active around Cuito Cuanavale, two were stationed just north of Mavinga, and another two remained mobile, attached to the forces harassing the FAPLA brigades as they advanced. Both FALA and their South African counterparts were greatly aided by the fact that the inexperienced Angolan pilots often followed fixed routes, navigating by physical features such as rivers and roads. According to South African historian Janet Szabo, "this made it easy...to predict and anticipate their moves as the terrain presented very few distinct physical features, and infrastructure, such as roads, was very limited. But this would change with the arrival of Cuban and Soviet pilots."

South Africa took advantage of FAPLA's numerous delays to assemble an expeditionary force strong enough to stop the FAPLA drive on Mavinga, an initiative known as Operation Moduler. The first 700 South African troops were deployed to Mavinga on August 4. On August 13, the South Africans initiated first contact with FAPLA by firing on the lead elements of 47 and 59 Brigades with a battery of 120mm mortars.

On August 19, the 47 and 59 Brigades came under heavy bombardment from a battery of South African Valkiri multiple rocket launchers. Simultaneously, a South African special forces team demolished the primary bridge over the Cuito River. Cuban engineers began working immediately to rebuild the bridge. In the meantime, however, FAPLA had to resort to the much more time consuming method of ferrying supplies across the river by barge, and the four advance brigades were temporarily starved of fuel and ammunition, slowing their progress even more. From August 19 to August 26, the South African Valkiris and 120mm mortars fired on 47 and 59 Brigades daily.

=== Lomba River battles, September—October ===
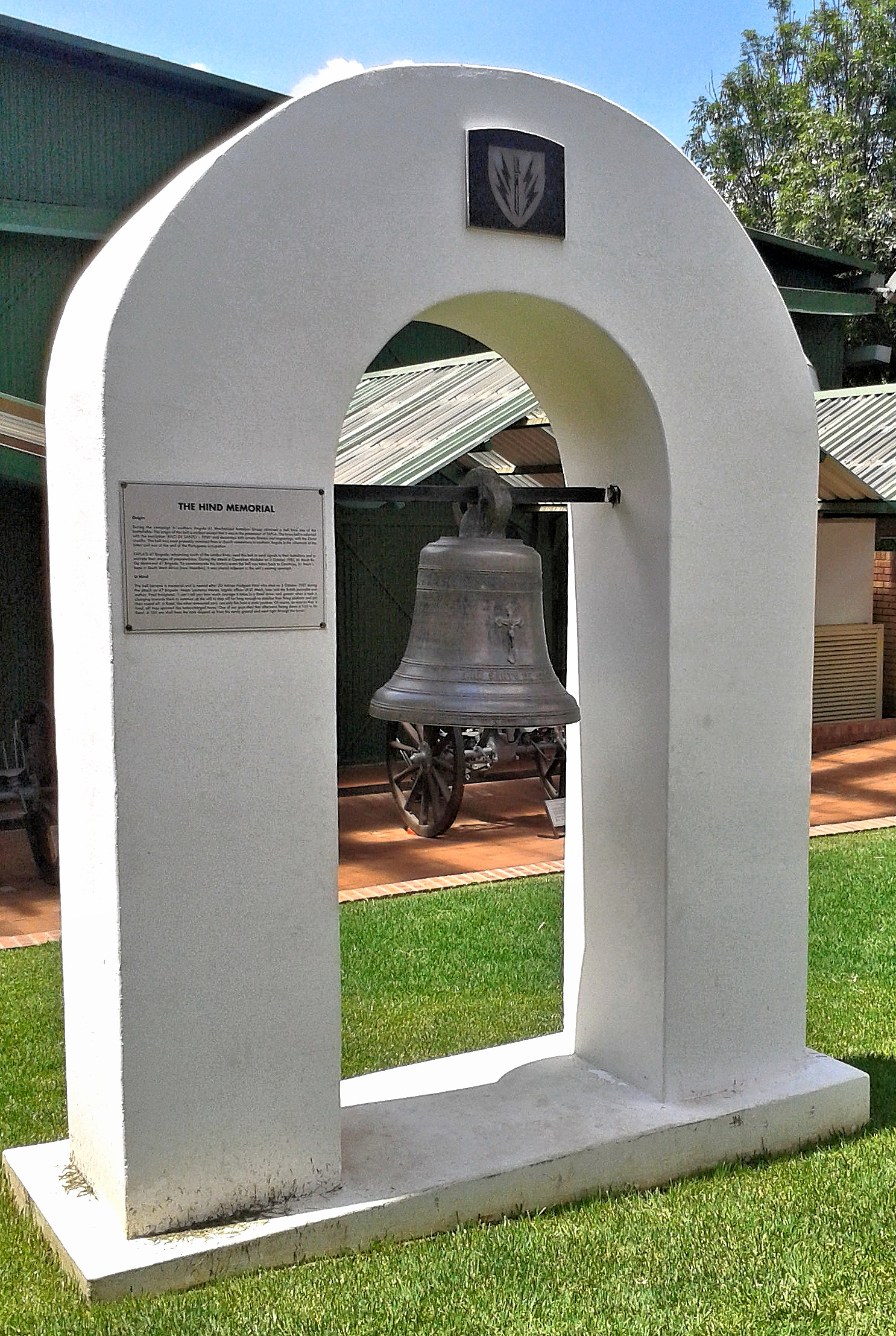
Signal bell used by 47 Brigade at the Lomba River.

By the last week of August 1987, the South African forces near Mavinga had built up to include 32 Battalion, 101 Battalion, and the 61 Mechanised Battalion Group. This composite formation, now numbering around 3,000, was also bolstered by a single battery of G5 howitzers. The South African units were concentrated around the Lomba River, which was the last of three major rivers the four leading FAPLA brigades needed to cross before reaching Mavinga. The FAPLA general staff had minimal intelligence about FALA activity south of the Lomba, and was completely ignorant of the South African buildup. On the other hand, thanks to constant shadowing of the advance, FAPLA's opponents had extremely detailed intelligence on the brigades' composition, size, and day to day movements. In the fourth volume of their work War of Intervention in Angola, historians Adrien Fontanellaz, Tom Cooper, and José Augusto Matos noted:

the Angolan and Soviet commanders were all but blind: not only had their intelligence entirely failed to detect the South African presence, they made no use of at least two MiG-21R reconnaissance fighters...and the capability of Angolan Su-22s to carry KKR-1 reconnaissance pods. Furthermore, they never thought to let at least the helicopter gunships conduct visual reconnaissance, and conducted no ground reconnaissance south of the Lomba, and thus had next to no idea about FALA dispositions.

47 and 59 Brigades reached the Lomba River on August 28. At this phase, 47 Brigade began to advance westwards around the source of the river to establish a bridgehead on its southern banks. Meanwhile, 59 Brigade and 21 Brigade were to join forces in the FAPLA centre and establish their own crossing site. 59 Brigade began moving eastwards to link up with 21 Brigade accordingly. 16 Brigade advanced further eastwards and did not attempt a river crossing. Its objective may have been to keep FALA occupied in the east and prevent it from interfering with the river crossings.

The FAPLA general staff possibly intended to envelope the main body of the defending FALA and South African force at the Lomba between 47 Brigade's bridgehead to the west, and 21 Brigade's bridgehead to the east. If both bridgeheads were successful and the brigades were able to quickly advance south of the Lomba, the defenders would be caught in a pincer, as withdrawal to their immediate south was difficult due to marshy terrain. However, these series of movements around the Lomba also left the four brigades isolated and at high risk of being individually engaged and destroyed by the (otherwise severely outnumbered) South African blocking force. Their inability to reinforce each other on short notice was further aggravated by the topography around the Lomba, which consisted of tributaries and largely impassable swampland. The topography also hampered tactical coordination within the brigades, resulting in FAPLA infantry often becoming separated from their attached armour. FALA insurgents frequently took advantage of this to isolate and ambush the FAPLA tanks.

The 61 Mechanised Battalion Group subsequently defeated the four leading FAPLA brigades in a series of piecemeal actions throughout September 1987. On September 9, 61 Mechanised repelled an initial crossing attempt by 21 Brigade. On September 13, it thwarted 47 Brigade's attempts to establish a bridgehead on the Lomba's southern bank, destroying all its bridging equipment. This prompted 47 Brigade to withdraw a short distance from the river and establish defensive works, from which it made no attempt to advance for weeks. On September 16, a second crossing attempt by 21 Brigade ended in failure. Directed by artillery observers, the South African G5s inflicted heavy casualties on the 21 Brigade troops as they massed on the northern riverbank. Having belatedly realised the disadvantage of conducting separate crossings, the FAPLA general staff ordered 47 Brigade to abandon its initial objective and link up with 59 Brigade. The brigade's officers initially protested that they lacked sufficient fuel and supplies to continue advancing, but were overruled by the general staff. According to Soviet Lieutenant Colonel Igor Anatoliyevich Zhdarkin, due to the numerous unplanned engagements with 61 Mechanised, 47 Brigade was also critically short of ammunition. It was beginning to run low on fuel and rations as well. The brigade had taken heavy losses at this point, including 270 dead, 200 wounded, and the loss of two tanks.

On September 26, the Soviet advisers attached to 21 Brigade were targeted by a South African artillery strike, killing Lieutenant Oleg Snitko and injuring four other advisers.

By October 2, 47 Brigade and 59 Brigade were close to linking up, having successfully bridged the Lomba between their positions with two wooden pontoon bridges and a Soviet-supplied TMM folding bridge. However, 61 Mechanised annihilated 47 Brigade with a decisive counterattack on October 3, killing 600 FAPLA troops and destroying or capturing 127 vehicles. The brigade lost nearly all its attached tanks, artillery, and air defence equipment. Alexander Ivanovich Kalan, a Soviet adviser attached to 47 Brigade, reported that much of the brigade's equipment was abandoned intact on the southern bank, and could not be immediately recovered due to the fact that the bridges were either destroyed or blocked by destroyed vehicles. These included 12 T-54 tanks, 2 BMP-1s, 11 BTR-60PBs, 2 BTR-60PUs, 2 BM-21 Grads, 4 ZSU-23-4 Shilkas, 2 D-30 howitzers, a TMM bridgelayer, a P-15 radar system, and 45 Engesa trucks. Kalan and a group of other Soviet advisers later attempted to recover the equipment anyway, but their recovery vehicles could not manoeuvre off road through the waterlogged terrain. Gusev was particularly appalled at the loss of intact tanks, which had been abandoned in some cases with full ammunition loads by their FAPLA crews.

The following day, the South African positions on the south bank of the Lomba were reinforced by the arrival of 4 South African Infantry Battalion along with additional G5 howitzers and Olifant tanks, making the likelihood of another crossing attempt increasingly remote. On October 5, the FAPLA general staff ordered 16, 21, and 59 Brigades to cease crossing attempts and begin a general withdrawal from the Lomba River. At this phase the FAPLA advance force had lost a third of its combined strength. The FAPLA brigades had also expended most of their fuel, food, and ammunition. According to one South African military report, "with one of its four offensive brigades totally destroyed and two of the remaining three badly mauled...[FAPLA] was left with no option but to begin withdrawing in the direction of Cuito Cuanavale."

On October 6, FAPLA launched a major aerial bombardment of the Lomba to cover the withdrawal of 16, 21, and 59 Brigades. Fifty air sorties were carried out that day, and another sixty on October 7.

Operation Saluting October was formally terminated by the FAPLA general staff on October 7, having failed well short of its objective due to the South African intervention. The brigades involved were ordered to return to their staging areas at Cuito Cuanavale. Upon receiving this news, President dos Santos summoned Gusev and the senior Cuban general officer, Gustavo Fleitas Ramirez, for an urgent conference to discuss the worsening military situation and the failure of Operation Saluting October. Ramirez reminded dos Santos that Cuba had been opposed to the offensive from the beginning. Gusev lamented in his memoirs that "I informed [chief of the Soviet general staff] Akhromeyev about the result of the operation, but the most difficult task, in moral terms, was to inform the president of Angola, whom I had assured that the operation would succeed and that Savimbi would be crushed".

== Aftermath ==
Reflecting on the aftermath of Saluting October, Fidel Castro stated that the operation had been doomed by logistical woes from the beginning. He criticised Gusev's decision to launch the offensive from areas "at the extreme end of the strategic line being defended by Cuba...a remote place where supplies and logistics were made very difficult." Soviet Minister of Defence Dmitry Yazov maintained that if Cuba had agreed to support the offensive with its regular ground forces, Saluting October would have been successful. Castro did not publicly revisit the topic of the offensive again until a speech delivered on July 26, 1988. During this speech, he acknowledged Saluting October had been a failure but refrained from directly blaming either the Soviet or Angolan leadership. He simply commented that a number of errors had been made, and Cuba bore no responsibility for them.

The involvement of South African troops was not made public until November 13, when the South African Minister of Defence, Magnus Malan, disclosed that military forces had been committed to halt Saluting October and save FALA from annihilation. Previously, Savimbi had denied direct South African involvement and claimed that FALA had stopped the FAPLA offensive on its own. The South African forces pursued 15, 59, and 21 Brigades as they withdrew, and subsequently launched Operation Hooper and Operation Packer to destroy them east of the Cuito River.

Historian William Minter found that Western and Cuban accounts both "fault Soviet strategic advice for significant errors" during Operation Saluting October. Minter wrote that Western and Cuban assessments agreed that FAPLA had overstretched its logistical capabilities to mount a conventional offensive of this scale. Another historian, Jonathan House, asserted that Saluting October failed due for the same reasons as Operation Second Congress: "the combination of fragile logistics, inexperienced leaders, and [South African] spoiling actions wrecked the Soviet plans."

In his work Tank Battles of the Cold War, Anthony Tucker-Jones wrote that the Soviets' "rigid doctrine and poor command and control structure of the Angolan army" were the main causes for the offensive's failure. Tucker-Jones claimed that the Soviet military mission had ignored their own counter-insurgency experiences in Afghanistan, and committed a serious blunder by assuming they could rely solely on "overwhelming numbers of armour and infantry" to crush FALA.

During his analysis of Soviet military doctrine applied in non-European theatres, Kenneth Pollack found that Saluting October was hamstrung by FAPLA's "poor unit cohesion and erratic command and control". Pollack observed that the FAPLA general staff often failed to issue timely orders, and indeed the brigade commanders had to endure "long stretches without any orders at all". He concurred with most Western analysts that the Soviet military mission had performed "disastrously" in the planning of the offensive, although he did not fault Soviet doctrine, insisting the same basic armour and infantry tactics were applied with more success by the better-trained and led Cuban forces during other operations.

An examination of the campaign by Major Michael Morris of the United States Marine Corps found that FAPLA's "level of training" was "never sufficient...to capitalise on the strengths of the methodical Russian offensive approach." Inadequate training and leadership, Morris claimed, largely negated FAPLA's advantage in heavy weapons during its offensive. Morris observed that the presence of Soviet advisers and pilots "could not make up for the training deficiencies of the Angolan soldiers who did most of the fighting."

Zhdarkin cited multiple factors that contributed to the FAPLA defeat, namely logistics failures resulting in ammunition shortages, the lack of clarity in orders passed down the FAPLA chain of command, the indecisiveness of the FAPLA officers, and low morale among the enlisted troops.

British diplomat Leycester Coltman placed the responsibility for the operation's failure squarely on Gusev, claiming that FAPLA suffered multiple setbacks as a result of his "cautious and unimaginative" leadership.

New military developments emerged elsewhere in Angola as a result of Saluting October. FALA's grip on the Benguela Railway was seriously weakened as it diverted forces south to resist the FAPLA offensive. Consequently, FAPLA was able to retake several towns along the rail line while Saluting October was underway. The understrength FALA forces tasked with defending these settlements were forced to withdraw eastwards towards the Zambian border. Some of the insurgents actually retreated across the border and were detained by the Zambian security forces. FALA offered to release two captured MK cadres in exchange for its troops in Zambian captivity, but was rebuffed.

FAPLA launched yet another conventional offensive on Mavinga in December 1989, Operação Último Assalto (Operation Final Assault). On this occasion, the FAPLA brigades were able to establish successful crossing points on the Lomba River and overrun the settlement. However, they did not press their advantage towards Jamba, and FALA launched a counteroffensive which retook Mavinga in May 1990. Mavinga would remain in FALA's hands until 2001, shortly before the insurgents were finally defeated in the civil war.

=== Casualties ===
By October 5, two days before Saluting October was cancelled, FAPLA had suffered 1,059 dead and 2,118 wounded in its failed offensive. The majority of these casualties were sustained as a result of the South African air and artillery strikes launched under the auspices of Operation Moduler, particularly during the initial approach to the Lomba River. Saney argued that "Soviet military planning contributed to the high death toll," claiming that the inefficient manner in which FAPLA massed its formations on Soviet advice caused heavy losses.

FAPLA lost 61 T-54/T-55 tanks, 53 BTR-60s, 7 BMP-1s, and at least 43 other vehicles. At least 20 of the 61 tanks lost were captured intact by FALA. FALA would later transfer some of these tanks to its forces spread throughout Angola, namely in Bié Province, where they were deployed against local FAPLA garrisons beginning in December 1987.

Aside from the armor, FAPLA lost a complete 9K33 Osa air defence system, which was abandoned near the Lomba River and removed by the South Africans for inspection. The captured system was later sent to the US to be evaluated by intelligence officials there.

FALA initially reported that FAPLA lost 3 fighter aircraft. The downing of a FAPLA MiG-23ML, serial number "C477", on an unknown date in September was confirmed by photographic evidence and subsequent inspection of its wreckage by Western analysts. A MiG-21bis with a Cuban pilot, Lieutenant Luis António Morais, was shot down by one of FALA's Stinger missiles on September 2. Another MiG-23ML was shot down by a South African anti-aircraft gun on October 7.

Less clear is the extent of FAPLA helicopter losses. FALA claimed to have shot down 11 helicopters during Saluting October. FAPLA records only acknowledge the loss of 2 Mi-17s as a result of a mid-air collision caused by pilot error. Soviet sources mention another Mi-17 was shot down over Cassamba during the feint involving 3, 39, 43, and 54 Brigades in late July or early August. According to Janes, FAPLA lost 3 helicopters to ground fire in southeastern Angola in late 1987.

Four members of the Soviet military mission were killed during Saluting October. One was killed by a FALA land mine during the initial staging process in July. Another 3 died during the failed crossing attempts on the Lomba in September. Four Soviet personnel were wounded.

FALA had suffered 155 dead and 662 wounded at the time of the FAPLA withdrawal. At least 4 insurgents were taken prisoner.

South African losses acknowledged for the entirety of Operation Moduler, which did not conclude until November 30, were 17 dead and 41 wounded. The South Africans also lost 3 Ratel infantry fighting vehicles, 2 Casspir armoured personnel carriers, and an Aermacchi AM.3 (Bosbok) spotter aircraft. A South African Mirage F1CZ fighter was heavily damaged by a FAPLA MiG-23ML and initially reported as lost, but it was later repaired and returned to service.

=== Allegations of war crimes ===
According to Zhdarkin, FAPLA executed nearly all the prisoners taken during the early phases of Saluting October. These included wounded FALA insurgents, who were beaten to death with entrenching tools. Zhdarkin wrote that "several times our Soviet specialists managed to save prisoners by literally wresting them from the grasp of enraged Angolans." Per Zhdarkin's account, the Soviets began taking custody of the prisoners and transporting them to the rear in their own vehicles to prevent illegal executions by FAPLA enlisted troops. He asserted that the systemic massacre of captured insurgents was a relatively new phenomenon in 1987.

During the late 1980s, FALA insurgents frequently cited fears of summary execution by FAPLA as a major deterrent to desertion or defection. Aside from extrajudicial killings, the FAPLA general staff also tried and executed FALA prisoners through military tribunals. These executions occurred in spite of the Angolan government's official policy, which was to enroll prisoners in reintegration programs and return them to civilian life.
