= Battle of Cuito Cuanavale =

1987–88 battle of the Northern African Border War in southern Angola

- Part of the Angolan Civil War and the South African Border War
- Battle of Cuito Cuanavale (Angola)
Date	Intermittently between 14 August 1987 – 23 March 1988 (7 months, 1 week and 2 days)
Location	15°09′50″S 19°10′23″E; Cuito Cuanavale, Angola
Result	Overwhelming South African Victory; South Africa and UNITA defeat a major FAPLA offensive towards Mavinga, inflicting heavy casualties on FAPLA and preserving UNITA's control of southern Angola.; Remaining FAPLA units repel several South African and UNITA attacks near the Tumpo River.; Withdrawal over several months of most South African and UNITA troops from Cuito Cuanavale under Operation Displace; Round One of Tripartite Accord talks commences

Belligerents
National Union for the Total Independence of Angola (UNITA): Armed Forces for the Liberation of Angola (FALA); South Africa: South African Defence Force; South West African Territorial Force (SWATF)	People's Republic of Angola: People's Armed Forces of Liberation of Angola (FAPLA); Cuba: Cuban Revolutionary Armed Forces (FAR); South West African People's Organisation: People's Liberation Army of Namibia (PLAN); African National Congress: Umkhonto we Sizwe (MK); Military advisors: Soviet Union; East Germany; North Korea; Vietnam

Commanders and leaders
Arlindo Pena Ben-Ben; Abreu Kamorteiro; Demósthenes Amós Chilingutila (South Africa) Magnus Malan (South Africa) Andreas Liebenberg (South Africa) Deon Ferreira (South Africa) Piet Muller	António França (Soviet Union) Pyotr Gusev (Soviet Union) Ivan Ryabchenko (Cuba) Ulises Rosales del Toro (Cuba) Arnaldo Ochoa (Cuba) Leopoldo Cintra Frías

Strength
UNITA: 28,000 militants 37,000 irregulars 24+ T-55 tanks South Africa: 700 combat troops (later up to 3,000); 13 Olifant tanks 120 Ratel infantry fighting vehicles 1 battery of Valkiri; 2 batteries of G5 howitzers 1 troop of G6 howitzers 12 multirole fighter aircraft 4 bomber aircraft	FAPLA: 6,000 combat troops (later up to 18,000); 150 T-55/62 tanks ~97 BRDM-2 scout cars 80+ armoured personnel carriers ~43 BM-21 Grad; 96 multirole fighter aircraft 8 bomber aircraft Cuba: 300 advisory personnel 3,000 combat troops (February, 1988); 32 T-55/62 tanks Auxiliary forces: Soviet Union: 1,000 advisory personnel; East Germany: 2,000 advisory personnel; PLAN: 7,000 guerrillas; MK: 900 guerrillas

Casualties and losses
UNITA: 3,000 killed South Africa: 38 dead (Note: The SADF acknowledged 31 dead during Operations Moduler, Hooper, and Packer. The figure is increased to 38 when non-combat related casualties during the battle are taken into account, such as accidents and friendly fire. The combined number of SADF and SWATF dead in Angola between 1987 and 1988 may be as high as 86, although that includes losses sustained in other operations, some of which postdate the Cuito Cuanavale campaign.); 90 wounded 3 tanks lost 5 Ratels lost 6 other armoured vehicles lost 2 aircraft shot down 1 aircraft crashed	FAPLA: 4,768 dead 10,000+ wounded 94 tanks lost 65 APCs lost 12 aircraft shot down Cuba: 42 soldiers dead 7 pilots dead 3 pilots POW; 70 wounded (UNITA claim); 6 tanks lost 6 aircraft shot down MK: 100 dead 2 POW; Soviet Union: 3-4 dead 5 wounded

The Battle of Cuito Cuanavale was fought intermittently between 14 August 1987 and 23 March 1988, south and east of Cuito Cuanavale, Angola, by the People's Armed Forces for the Liberation of Angola (FAPLA) and Cuba against South Africa and the National Union for the Total Independence of Angola (UNITA) during the Angolan Civil War and South African Border War. (Note: In the historiography of the battle, the term "Battle of Cuito Cuanavale" is sometimes regarded as a misnomer, because there was no battle for the settlement itself, although a number of localised operations were undertaken by the SADF and UNITA in its vicinity to prevent any FAPLA advance towards Mavinga. The SADF and UNITA never launched a direct assault on the town; their major offensives were confined east of the Cuito River.) The battle was the largest engagement of the Angolan conflict and the biggest conventional battle on the African continent since World War II. UNITA and its South African allies defeated a major FAPLA offensive towards Mavinga, preserving UNITA's control of southern Angola. A subsequent counteroffensive was launched around the Tumpo River east of Cuito Cuanavale, and succeeded in ending FAPLA advances but failed to eliminate all remaining FAPLA positions.

After several failed attempts to take control of Southern Angola in 1986, eight FAPLA brigades mustered for a final offensive—Operation Saluting October—in August 1987 with extensive auxiliary support from the Soviet Union. The FAPLA offensive took the form of a two-pronged, multi-divisional movement southwards towards Mavinga, a major UNITA stronghold and logistics centre. Once Mavinga was in its hands, FAPLA intended to expel the remaining insurgents from Moxico Province and pave the way for a final assault on the UNITA headquarters at Jamba. The Soviet Union supplied FAPLA with over a billion dollars' worth of new military hardware for the purpose of this offensive, and Soviet advisers were attached to each FAPLA unit on the brigade level.

South Africa, which shared a border with Angola through the contested territory of South West Africa (Namibia), was then determined to prevent FAPLA from gaining control of Mavinga and allowing insurgents of the People's Liberation Army of Namibia (PLAN) to operate in the region. Saluting October prompted the South African Defence Force (SADF) to underpin the defence of Mavinga and launch Operation Moduler with the objective of stopping FAPLA's advance. After weeks of preliminary skirmishes, the two armies met at the Lomba River on 6 September. Throughout September and October, the SADF repulsed several FAPLA attempts to cross the Lomba and destroyed most of FAPLA's vital bridging equipment. Repeated counterattacks by the SADF's 61 Mechanised Battalion Group resulted in the annihilation of FAPLA's 47 Brigade and the loss of its remaining bridgeheads, forcing the remainder of the FAPLA units to withdraw towards positions east of Cuito Cuanavale.

During the second phase of the campaign, the SADF and UNITA made several unsuccessful attempts to encircle and destroy the surviving FAPLA forces before they could establish new defensive positions east of Cuito Cuanavale, an initiative known as Operation Hooper. However, FAPLA succeeded in concentrating its forces within a cramped perimeter between the Cuito, Tumpo, and Dala rivers known as the "Tumpo Triangle". Here they were protected by the terrain and by extensive minefields. They were also reinforced by Cuban armoured and motorised units, which had become more directly committed to the fighting for the first time since the beginning of Cuba's military intervention in Angola in 1975. Over two months the SADF and UNITA launched six unsuccessful assaults on the Tumpo Triangle under the auspices of Operation Packer. The defending FAPLA and Cuban troops held their lines in the Tumpo Triangle. The SADF and UNITA disengaged in March 1988, after laying a series of minefields southeast of Cuito Cuanavale to dissuade a renewed FAPLA offensive.

Both sides claimed victory. The Cuban and FAPLA commanders had interpreted the SADF's Tumpo Triangle campaign as part of a larger effort to seize the town of Cuito Cuanavale itself, and they presented their stand there as a successful defensive action. The SADF achieved its basic objectives of halting the FAPLA offensive toward Mavinga, and decided not to occupy Cuito Cuanavale itself, which they claimed would have entailed unacceptable losses to their expeditionary force.

Today, the Battle of Cuito Cuanavale is credited by some with ushering in the first round of trilateral negotiations, mediated by the United States, which secured the withdrawal of Cuban and South African troops from Angola and Namibia by 1991.

== Background ==
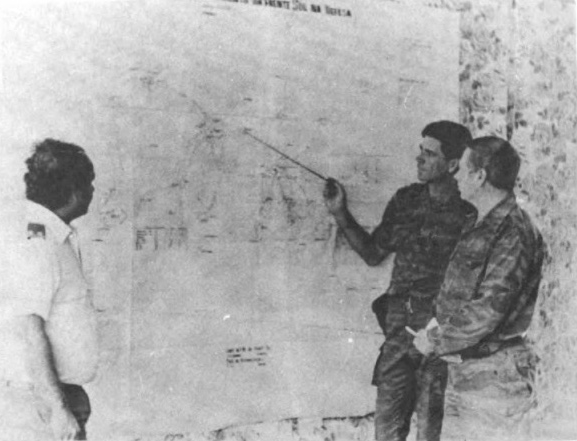
Soviet advisers planning military operations in Angola, early 1980s

The Angolan Civil War played out against the backdrop of the Cold War struggle between the Soviet Union and the United States. Both superpowers tried to influence the outcome of the civil war through proxies.

For 13 years until 1974, three armed groups fought for Angola's independence from Portugal: the Soviet-backed Popular Movement for the Liberation of Angola (MPLA) (with its armed wing FAPLA), led by Agostinho Neto; the conservative National Liberation Front of Angola (FNLA), led by Holden Roberto and supported by Mobutu Sese Seko of Zaïre; and UNITA, led by Jonas Savimbi.

After the Carnation Revolution of April 1974 in Portugal, the new revolutionary government of Portugal let go of Portugal's African overseas possessions, including Angola. The Treaty of Alvor comprised a series of agreements between the three rebel factions and Portugal that were to pave the way to independence. Under its terms, a transitional government was formed, elections were scheduled for the end of the year, and 11 November 1975 was slated as Angola's independence day. Fighting between the three rebel factions started soon after the transitional government took office on 31 January 1975, with each movement gaining control of their traditional areas of influence by mid-1975: the MPLA in the capital and central Angola, the FNLA in the north and UNITA in the south. The FNLA was defeated in the 1970s and the struggle for control continued between the Soviet-backed MPLA forces and the United States- and South African-backed UNITA movement. The MPLA government of Angola and SWAPO were supported by Cuba, the Soviet Union, and other communist states, while UNITA and FNLA were supported by capitalist states (albeit clandestinely), foremost among them the United States and South Africa.

Between 1975 and 1976, Cuban and South African troops participated in the fighting on behalf of the MPLA and UNITA, respectively. According to Cuban leader Fidel Castro, the presence of the Cuban Revolutionary Armed Forces (FAR) in Angola was in accordance with an "internationalist mission" to combat colonialism and "defend [Angolan] independence". For its part, South Africa perceived Cuban and Soviet interference with the Angolan conflict as an example of regional communist expansionism.

Angola

After the Cubans had helped the MPLA gain power in 1975 they considered it necessary to stay in the country until conditions stabilized. The Soviet Union and other Eastern bloc countries supplied FAPLA with armament, advisors, and specialized technical staff. UNITA managed, with South African and US support, to continue posing a military threat to the MPLA government. UNITA received backing from the US, most notably in the form of Stinger missiles that helped repel the air superiority of the FAPLA forces. South Africa also provided UNITA with arms and training.

South Africa had governed South West Africa (Namibia) under an expired League of Nations mandate since annexing the territory from the German Empire during World War I. In 1966, the South West African Liberation Army (later known as the People's Liberation Army of Namibia) launched an armed struggle to free the territory from South African rule. Following the MPLA's ascension to power, SWAPO gained its support and began operating from sanctuaries inside Angola.

The South African government's strategic concern was thus to ensure continued UNITA control over regions bordering South West Africa, so as to prevent the SWAPO guerrillas from receiving Angolan support and gaining a springboard in southern Angola from which to launch attacks into South West Africa. Its security strategy was shaped by the doctrines of pre-emptive interventionism and counter-revolutionary warfare. Following the South African Operation Protea in August 1981, in which it temporarily occupied 50,000 square kilometres (19,000 sq mi) of Cunene province, UNITA took effective administrative control of most of Cunene in January 1982.

== Operation Saluting October ==
Because of the UNITA insurgency, the central government never managed to gain control of the whole country; UNITA had control of much of southeastern Angola. Whenever it was threatened, South Africa intervened on its behalf. South Africa kept the whole southern border in Angola and at times up to 50,000 km^{2} (19,000 sq mi) of Cunene province occupied and conducted invasions and raids into the country.

In 1987, as part of the Angolan government campaign against UNITA and for the control of south-eastern Angola, FAPLA launched Operação Saudemos Outubro ("Saluting October") to drive UNITA forces from their strongholds of Mavinga (a former Portuguese military base) and Jamba in the southeast of the country, north of the Caprivi Strip. As in previous campaigns, planning and leadership was taken over by the Soviets and the higher ranks in the units were taken over by Soviet officers. Combat operations were directed by Lieutenant General Petr Gusev, head of the Soviet military mission in Angola, nominally with the oversight of the Angolan Ministry of Defence. Also instrumental in the operational planning was Gusev's chief of staff, Major General Ivan Ryabchenko. Aside from the Soviets, FAPLA forces were accompanied by a large contingent of East German military advisers serving in various technical and support roles, namely communications. The East German communications personnel would play a key role in monitoring South African and UNITA radio transmissions.

Cuban disagreements with the Soviet and FAPLA general staff in the past had resulted in much of the support roles during Soviet-directed FAPLA offensives being filled by East German advisers instead. Some Cuban military personnel, however, continued to be employed in technical positions alongside the East Germans during Operation Saluting October. On the personal orders of Fidel Castro, Cuban combat forces were explicitly forbidden from participating in Saluting October. "Don't get into such wasting, costly, and finally pointless offensives," Castro had vented to Gusev's staff. "And count us out if you do." Castro and the Cuban general staff in Angola opposed Saluting October on the grounds that FAPLA was being forced to adopt tactics more applicable to Soviet conventional operations in central Europe than an offensive against an irregular fighting force on the broken African terrain. Gusev and Ryabchenko had also planned Operation Saluting October based on their experiences moving similarly sized units in the Soviet Union, and had failed to take into account the logistical disadvantages and technical shortcomings of the FAPLA forces involved.

FAPLA's equipment was upgraded, including 150 T-55 tanks and Mi-24 helicopters. The Soviets dismissed the advice of the Cubans, as in the campaigns before, who warned that the operation would create another opportunity for a South African intervention. It was decided to commence the attack from Cuito Cuanavale.

Taking notice of the massive military build-up, South Africa warned UNITA. The FAPLA campaign was initially successful but also proceeded at an extremely slow pace. The brigades involved in the offensive advanced cautiously, covering just under 4 kilometres a day, and ceased all other activity in the late afternoon to construct elaborate defensive works. This would prove to be a fatal error, as it allowed South Africa to compile detailed intelligence on their movements and make preparations for its own build-up to counter the offensive.

The South African government became aware that UNITA would not be able to withstand the onslaught. On 15 June it decided to intervene and authorised covert support. On 4 August 1987 the SADF launched Operation Moduler which was to stop the Angolan advance on Mavinga to prevent a rout of UNITA. The SADF 61 Mechanized Battalion crossed into Angola from their base at the border town of Rundu.

== Objectives and outcomes ==
The Battle of Cuito Cuanavale was part of the Angolan Civil War, itself a proxy war in the Cold War. The FAPLA strategic objective was to destroy UNITA, win the civil war and thus take sole control of the entire country. As part of that process FAPLA brigades advanced south-east from Cuito Cuanavale to attack UNITA at Mavinga.

The South African strategic objective was to prevent SWAPO from using southern Angola to launch attacks into South West Africa. To achieve this the SADF supported UNITA in southern Angola, and when FAPLA advanced from Cuito Cuanavale to attack UNITA at Mavinga, the SADF intervened to protect UNITA by stopping that advance.

The FAPLA attack was comprehensively smashed by the SADF intervention, with FAPLA and its Cuban allies suffering heavy casualties. Members of the ANC claim that MK also lost about 100 combatants. The SADF's immediate objective was thus achieved, in that the FAPLA advance was halted outside Cuito Cuanavale, and was abandoned shortly thereafter. The Cuban/Angolan objective was thereafter reduced to securing the town of Cuito Cuanavale on the west of the river from capture. The SADF had a political imperative to avoid casualties wherever possible. There was never an attempt made to capture the town of Cuito Cuanavale, and the SADF had orders to avoid the town unless it fell into their hands without a fight.

Although the SADF achieved its objective of stopping the advance and protecting UNITA, FAPLA/Cuba also claimed victory in the battle.

== Battle ==
Also known as the Battle of the Lomba River, this battle took place near the town of Cuito Cuanavale in southern Angola. To the South African Defence Force, it took the form of four phases, which ran consecutively as a single overall battle. These were:

1. Operation Moduler – The aim of which was to halt and reverse the FAPLA advance on the UNITA strongholds of Mavinga and Jamba.
2. Operation Hooper – The aim of which was to inflict maximum casualties on the retreating FAPLA forces after they had been halted, to ensure there were no further attempts to resume the advance.
3. Operation Packer – The aim of which was to force the FAPLA forces to retreat to the west of the Cuito River, and to provide UNITA with a sustainable self-defence.
4. Operation Displace – The aim of which was to maintain a deterrence to any resumed advance against UNITA, while the bulk of the troops and equipment were withdrawn.

=== Operation Moduler ===
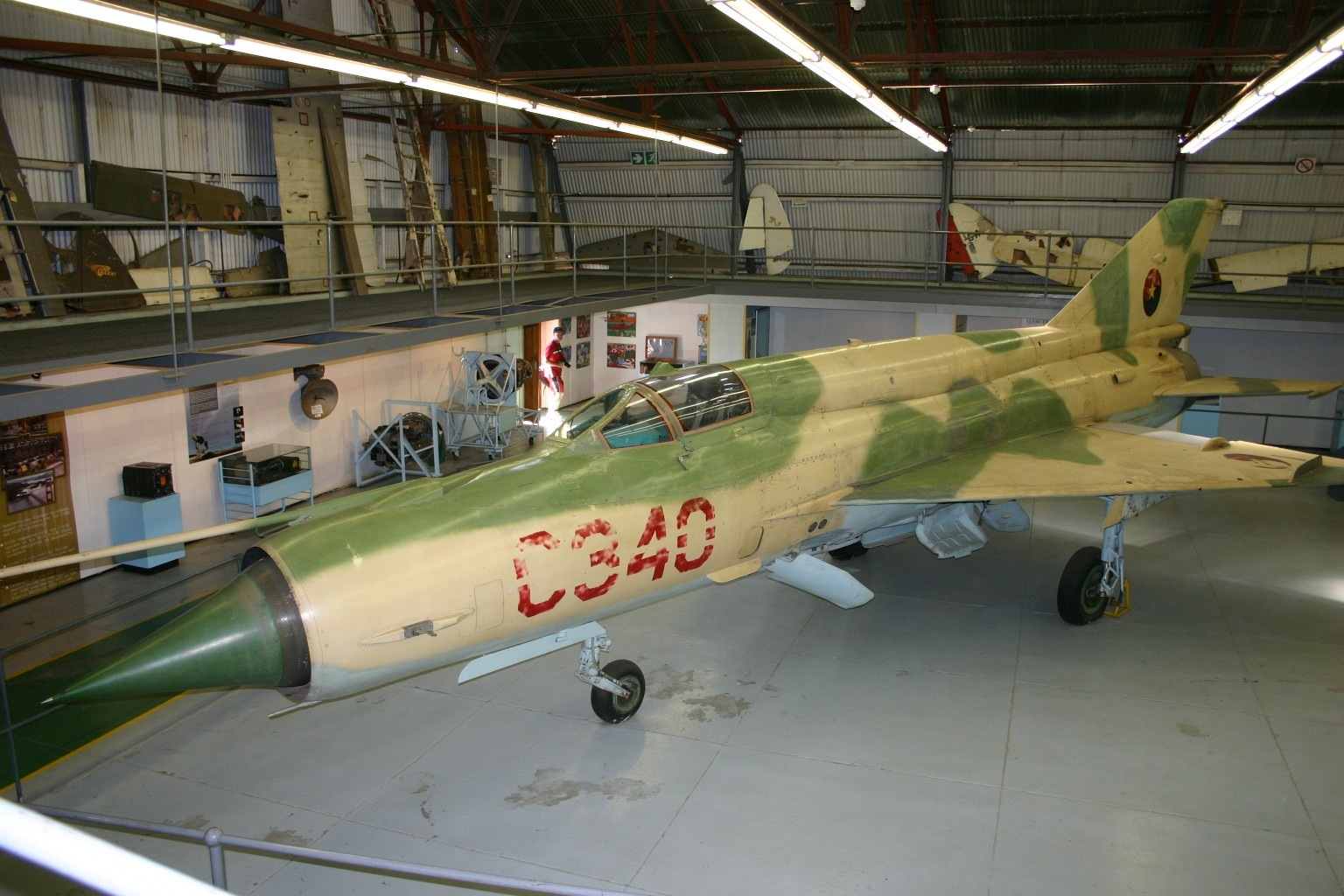
Angolan Air Force MiG-21

On 4 August 1987, the SADF launched Operation Moduler, which was to stop the Angolan advance on Mavinga to prevent a rout of UNITA. The SADF 61 Mechanized Battalion crossed into Angola from their base at the border town of Rundu. It was subsequently reinforced inside Angola by 32 Battalion, a special forces unit made up primarily of dissident Angolans led by SADF officers, as well as 101 Battalion of the auxiliary South West African Territorial Force (SWATF).

In August FAPLA's 16th, 21st (both light infantry), 47th (armoured) and 59th (mechanized) brigades, about 6,000 men and 80 tanks plus artillery and support vehicles, departed from Cuito Cuanavale to cross the Lomba River. They received air support from the airbase at Menongue, including MiG 23s deployed in ground attacks. Four more brigades were kept to defend Cuito Cuanavale and its approaches.

Facing them were the UNITA forces composed of the 3rd Regular, 5th Regular, 13th Semi-Regular and 275th Special Forces Battalions, supported by about 1,000 SADF troops with armoured vehicles and artillery. On 28 August FAPLA reached the northern banks of the Lomba River en route to Mavinga, where they were engaged by the SADF.

Map of the FAPLA offensive

In a series of bitter fights between 9 September and 7 October, SADF and UNITA achieved their primary objective of preventing the FAPLA from crossing the river. The Soviets withdrew their advisors and left the FAPLA without senior leadership, and FAPLA forces crumbled and ran. FAPLA suffered heavy losses, with all four brigades losing about 60–70% of their strength. Throughout the battle, FAPLA had lost 1,059 dead and 2,118 wounded, along with 61 tanks, 83 armoured vehicles and 20 rocket launchers. UNITA lost 155 killed and 622 wounded, the SADF lost 19 killed and 41 wounded and 5 armoured vehicles. The SADF also captured a highly sophisticated SA-8 anti-aircraft missile system – the first time the weapon had fallen into western hands. The Angolan army headed into a retreat over 190 km back to Cuito Cuanavale, which it desperately held on to.

Chester Crocker, who was the U.S. Assistant Secretary of State for African Affairs during the Reagan Administration, said that: "In some of the bloodiest battles of the entire civil war, a combined force of some 8,000 UNITA fighters and 4,000 SADF troops not only destroyed one FAPLA brigade but badly damaged several others out of a total FAPLA force of some 18,000 engaged in the three-pronged offensive. Estimates of FAPLA losses ranged upward of 4,000 killed and wounded….Large quantities of Soviet equipment were destroyed or fell into UNITA and SADF hands when FAPLA broke into a disorganized retreat... The 1987 military campaign represented a stunning humiliation for the Soviet Union, its arms and its strategy. ... As of mid-November, the UNITA/SADF force had destroyed the Cuito Cuanavale airfield and pinned down thousands of FAPLA's best remaining units clinging onto the town's defensive perimeters."

On 29 September, South African and UNITA forces, having gained the upper hand, launched a counter-attack. The objective was to inflict a crushing blow to the FAPLA, so that they would not consider another offensive in the following year. The restrictions previously placed on the SADF by their political masters were lightened, and the SADF committed tanks for the first time. The 4th SA Infantry Battalion was added to the mix, bringing the SADF strength up to about 3,000 men – the biggest of the entire campaign.

During this phase the SADF units were supported by heavy artillery and air strikes. The airstrip at Cuito Cuanavale was extensively bombarded, causing the Cubans to withdraw their aircraft to Menongue and to abandon the Cuanavale airstrip.

The SADF's tactics were based closely on those used by German commander Erwin Rommel during World War II when he defeated Allied forces in detail at the Battle of Gazala.

Map of the South African - UNITA counteroffensive

On 9 November the SADF attacked the FAPLA 16th brigade. Air strikes and artillery were used, and tanks went into battle alongside the armoured vehicles. UNITA infantry also participated. The 16th brigade was mauled, and withdrew in disarray back across the river. The battle ended after half a day, when the SADF vehicles ran low on ammunition and broke off the attack. FAPLA had 10 tanks destroyed and 3 captured, various artillery pieces destroyed or captured, and 75 men killed. The SADF had 7 killed and 9 wounded, plus one armoured vehicle destroyed, one damaged and a tank damaged.

The second attack, on 11 November, again targeted the 16th brigade. Again 16th brigade escaped annihilation by crossing the river, but this time they lost 14 tanks and 394 men. The SADF had 5 men killed and 19 more wounded, with 2 armoured vehicles destroyed and one tank damaged. The recovery, under fire, of a crippled tank and the subsequent re-entry of a minefield where the tank was extracted from to rescue a wounded soldier, earned Captain Petrus van Zyl and Lieutenant De Villers Vosloo of 32 Battalion both Honoris Crux decorations.

The FAPLA 21st brigade withdrew rapidly across the river, and was pursued. On 17 November they were engaged again, and suffered 131 casualties, along with 9 tanks destroyed and about 300 other vehicles. The SADF suffered 6 casualties and 19 wounded, plus 4 armoured vehicles. A final attack on 25 November bogged down in heavy bush, and was eventually abandoned.

Operation Moduler achieved the objective of halting the FAPLA advance against UNITA, and inflicted heavy losses on FAPLA. In Luanda, Angolan President José Eduardo dos Santos summoned General Gusev and the senior Cuban general officer, Gustavo Fleitas Ramirez, for an urgent conference to discuss the worsening military situation and the failure of Operation Saluting October. Gusev lamented in his memoirs that "I informed [chief of the Soviet general staff] Akhromeyev about the result of the operation, but the most difficult task, in moral terms, was to inform the president of Angola, whom I had assured that the operation would succeed and that Savimbi would be crushed".

=== Operation Hooper ===
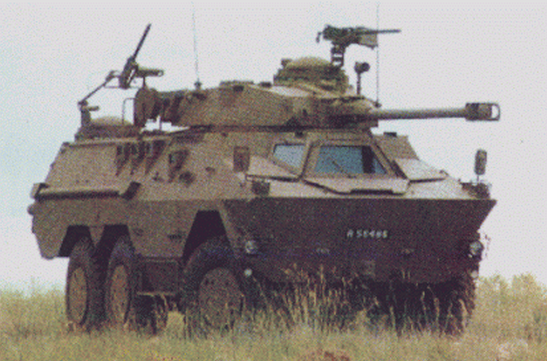
South African Ratel-90 combat vehicle. Its large cannon allowed it to be employed against FAPLA T-54/55 tanks at Cuito Cuanavale.

By November, the SADF had cornered the remnants of three FAPLA units on the east of the Cuito River, across from the town itself and was poised to destroy them. The quite demoralised 59th FAPLA motorised infantry brigade, 21st and 25th FAPLA light infantry brigades, in positions near Tumpo and east of the Cuito River, were effectively cut off due to SADF artillery control of both the bridge and airstrip and to UNITA guerrilla control of the road from Menongue, which they had mined and were prepared to ambush. With no functioning armour or artillery remaining, the FAPLA units faced annihilation.

On 15 November, the Angolan government requested direct military assistance from Cuba. Gusev had advised the FAPLA chief of general staff, António França, to ask for the intervention of Cuban combat units before the FAPLA lines collapsed further. General Arnaldo Ochoa, a veteran of the Ogaden War and then senior Cuban military officer in Angola, reported that the situation in the vicinity of the Cuito River "has continue to deteriorate...if the morale and fighting capacity of the [FAPLA] units are not reestablished, a catastrophe is inevitable." Cuban President Fidel Castro subsequently met with top members of the general staff in Havana to discuss, in his own words, "the desperate requests of the Angolan government and the Soviet military mission that we send our troops to that remote place, to wage a battle on terrain chosen by the enemy." As a result of this meeting, Castro authorised the deployment of advisers alongside the beleaguered FAPLA brigades around the Cuito River, in addition to the deployment of Cuban pilots and combat aircraft to Cuito Cuanavale. Ground troops were only to be deployed if FAPLA agreed to allow the FAR to assume command of the operational planning, and excluded the Soviet general staff.

The decision to deprive Gusev and the Soviet military mission of the supervisory role in FAPLA operations caused some tension between Havana and Moscow. Soviet Minister of Defence Dmitry Yazov complained that the Cuban decision to commit combat troops was belated, suggesting that Operation Saluting October could have succeeded had they been involved in the offensive from the beginning. However, Soviet chief of general staff Sergey Akhromeyev privately conceded to Cuban officials that there were errors made in the operational planning that doomed the offensive. Akhromeyev was instrumental in approving Soviet logistical support for the movement of FAR combat forces to Cuito Cunavale, and in return, was kept closely updated on the tactical situation by his Cuban counterparts. Most Soviet advisers attached to FAPLA on the brigade level were also not withdrawn from Cuito Cuanavale after the arrival of the Cuban troops, and continued to carry out their routine duties for the duration of the campaign.

The first Cuban reinforcements in Cuito arrived by helicopter on 5 December with about 160–200 technicians, advisers, officers, and special forces. By the beginning of January, this had been increased to about 1,500 troops, including tank crews. General Ochoa was also made overall commander of the FAPLA defensive efforts.

Ochoa and Castro were to have serious disagreements in the conduct of the war in Angola. These tensions were to have repercussions both during the war where Castro's interference with defence plans may have cost the Cubans dozens of lives and in the aftermath of Angolan hostilities a year later when Ochoa was arrested, tried and executed by firing squad after being found guilty of treason. General Cintras Frias was made commander at Cuito Cuanavale. The Cuban's initial priority was securing Cuito Cuanavale, but while reinforcements were arriving at the besieged garrison they made preparations for a second front to the west of Cuito Cuanavale in Lubango where the SADF had been operating unhindered for 8 years.

On 25 November, the UN Security Council demanded the SADF's unconditional withdrawal from Angola by 10 December.

The SADF units received fresh troops and equipment, but the units were reduced to about 2,000 men and 24 tanks for the rest of the operation. The new arrivals had to be acclimatised first. The SADF objective was defined as being to destroy the enemy east of the river or at least to drive them back across the river, inflicting maximum casualties but suffering minimum losses of their own. The river crossings were to be fortified and handed over to UNITA, and the SADF were to withdraw from Angola as soon as that was achieved. The order was that the town of Cuito Cuanavale would not be attacked unless it fell into SADF hands almost without a fight.

The bombardment started on 2 January 1988, with a mix of artillery and air strikes, and a UNITA infantry attack that failed. On 3 January the SADF destroyed the important bridge across the Cuito River using a Raptor glide bomb. The Cubans managed to construct a wooden footbridge in its place which they baptised Patria o Muerte (fatherland or death). They partly buried disabled tanks so that their turrets could be used as fixed artillery pieces.

32 Battalion and elements of other units harried the road convoys for weeks, destroying several hundred tanks and other vehicles, and inflicting an unknown number of casualties.

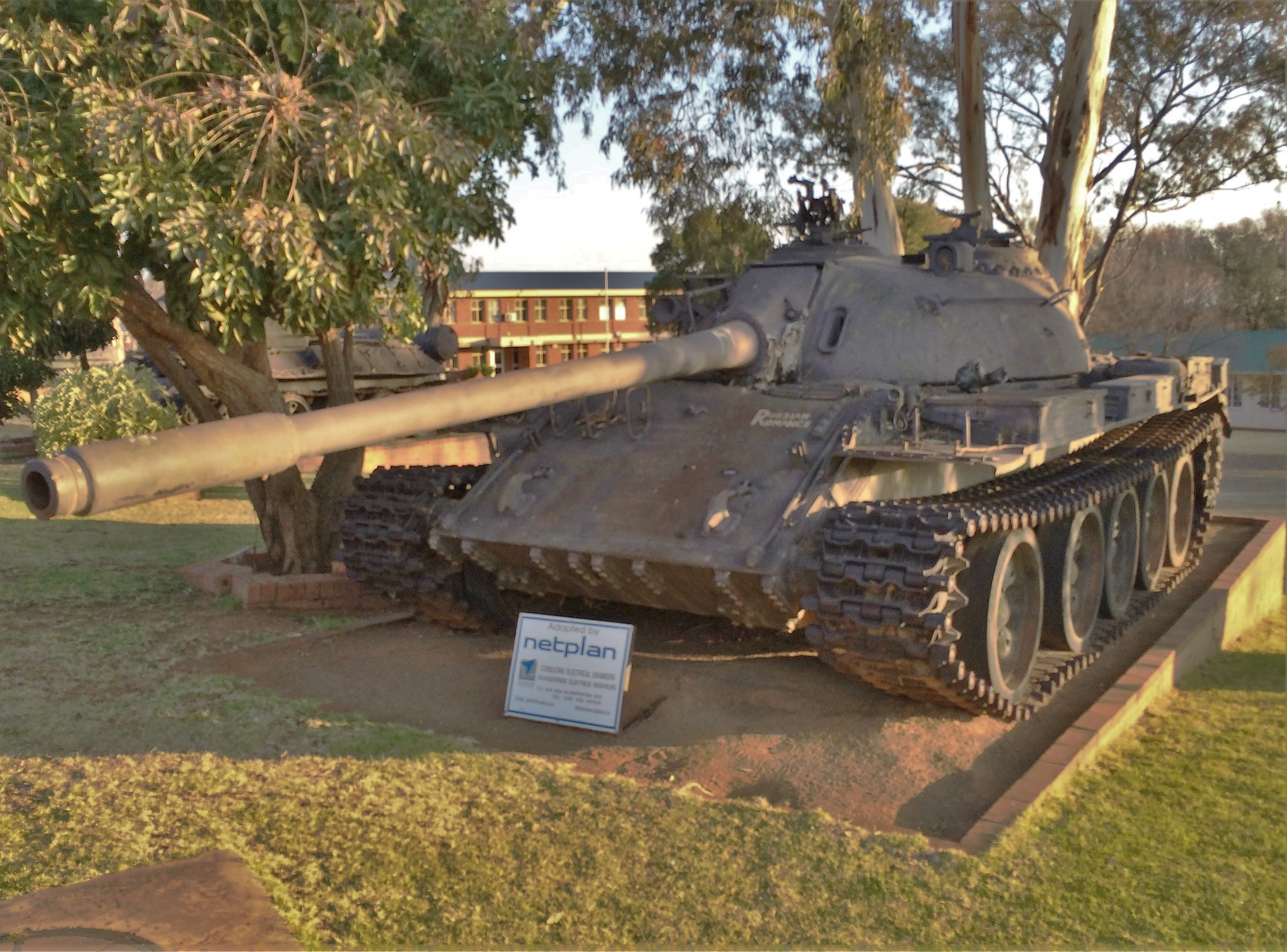
FAPLA or Cuban T-55 tank. A number engaged a force of Olifant Mk1As in the counter-attack against SADF advance units on 14 February.

On 13 January the SADF attacked the 21st brigade, starting with air strikes and artillery bombardments. Over two days the FAPLA unit was driven out of their positions, and lost 7 tanks with 5 more captured, various other vehicles destroyed and captured, and 150 men dead or captured. UNITA lost 4 dead and 18 wounded, and the SADF had one man wounded and one armoured vehicle damaged. However the SADF was again unable to exploit the momentum, due to a shortage of reserves and supplies. UNITA occupied the captured positions, and the SADF withdrew, but UNITA lost the positions later to a FAPLA counter-attack. A large Cuban and FAPLA column was on the way from Menongue for the relief of Cuito Cuanavale, but progress in the rainy season was slow due to the need to clear the UNITA minefields and guard against possible ambushes. They did not reach Cuito Cuanavale in time to take part in the first engagement.

The next attack was only on 14 February, against the positions of 21st brigade that UNITA had lost, and the neighbouring positions of the 59th brigade. Both 21st brigade and 59th brigade were forced to withdraw. The Cubans then launched a near suicidal counterattack which allowed the FAPLA to retreat across the bridgehead. The FAPLA lost 500 men and a further 32 Cuban soldiers, along with 15 tanks and 11 armoured vehicles. UNITA casualties were heavy, but the SADF had 4 killed and 11 wounded, plus some vehicles damaged. FAPLA withdrew to the Tumpo (river) triangle, a smaller area east of the river and across from Cuito Cuanavale. The land west of the Cuito river was ideal defensive territory as it was higher than the East bank, and the direction of attack forced the SADF to attack into the setting sun towards the afternoon. The high ground enabled FAPLA to deploy artillery over the horizon, out of sight of the SADF forward observers. They also laid extensive minefields in all of the routes that led to Cuito Cuanavale.

In an assault on 19 February a FAPLA position was disrupted, and it resulted in the FAPLA 59th brigade being withdrawn across the river. However the SADF had run into a minefield south of the FAPLA positions, which destroyed 2 Ratels. The explosions of the mines drew immediate artillery fire which forced the SADF to withdraw. The SADF launched another attack on 25 February, when an artillery barrage forced the FAPLA 25th brigade to withdraw to the bridgehead on the Tumpo river. The retreat was orderly, covered by Cuban aircraft. South African tanks soon advanced, but when one of them detonated a mine, it immediately alerted the Cubans and Angolans to the direction of their advance. The SADF was soon harassed by continuous artillery fire and Cuban airstrikes, which destroyed 2 Ratels and 3 vehicles. With casualties beginning to mount, the assault was soon called off. Although the FAPLA suffered heavy casualties, 172 FAPLA and 10 Cubans killed. The withdrawal to the Tumpo bridgehead was successful and the troops had simultaneously repelled a South African offensive, their first success after nearly 5 months of continuous disaster. Two days later, Castro sent a congratulatory message to the men of the 25th and 59th brigades.

=== Operation Packer ===
On the night of 22 March, around 21h00, the SADF units began to line up and prepare for an offensive to drive the Cubans and Angolans from the Tumpo Triangle, which would begin the next morning. As they moved forward during the night, the columns became temporarily lost and then had to continue their advance with only one tank de-miner when the other overturned. Around 04h00 on 23 March, SADF G-5 artillery began to bombard the forward positions of the FAPLA 25th Brigade. By 06h00 the SADF attack column was within 10 km of the FAPLA positions but had soon stopped as they were delayed by bad terrain and one of the tanks had broken down. Once the repair was completed the attack resumed around 08h15. Not long after the attack column began moving again, a tank hit a mine and the de-miner tank sent forward to clear the minefield was itself permanently disabled by a mine, unable to be moved. The column halted and sappers were brought forward to clear a way through the minefield with their Plofadders, an automated rocket-fired explosive de-miner. They failed to work and they had to be manually detonated, which delayed the operation by three hours. Cuban reports claimed that UNITA insurgents had been sent through the minefields at gunpoint to clear the way, prompting accusations that its troops had been used as "cannon fodder" by the SADF. Clearing of the minefields also attracted the attention of the FAPLA and Cuban artillerymen, which fired on the SADF column but was ineffective in hitting targets but slowed any progress they wished to make. During this time, UNITA fought a battle with elements of the FAPLA 38th Brigade on the high ground they captured earlier during the month, but they and the SADF forward observers were forced to retreat.

The SADF's main column resumed moving around 12h30 towards FAPLA 25th Brigade's positions, but just over an hour later hit another minefield. This disabled three SADF tanks and once again attracted the FAPLA and Cuban artillery. The South African commander moved his forces back out of the minefield as they attempted to retrieve the damaged tanks. By 14h30 a decision was made to withdraw altogether due to the minefields and heavy artillery attacks from both sides of the river. The South Africans suffered 13 dead and several dozen severely wounded, while UNITA suffered thousands of casualties. Several damaged South African tanks were abandoned in the minefield, and were subsequently captured by the Cubans and Angolans. This provided a huge propaganda victory for Castro. The SADF equipment, men and supplies were exhausted, and the SADF command determined that destroying the small FAPLA force remaining on the eastern bank of the river was not worth further casualties. The objective of protecting UNITA was deemed to have been achieved, and Operation Packer ended.

The Tumpo Triangle campaign exposed several flaws in the planning of the South African defence chiefs and general staff. They had estimated quite accurately that their forces would be able to inflict a crushing defeat on FAPLA in the flood plains and open terrain south of Cuito Cuanavale. But they had not anticipated so many Angolan units would survive and establish strong defensive lines in the Tumpo Triangle, or that the addition of Cuban troops there would stiffen the resistance considerably. It was soon realized that the SADF and UNITA would not be able to push the FAPLA/Cuban forces out of their Tumpo positions without taking serious casualties. The South African government had also ruled out an attack on Cuito Cuanavale from the west. Operation Packer thus came to an end on the 30 April 1988. 82 Brigade began to withdraw and was replaced with Battle Group 20.

== Operation Displace ==
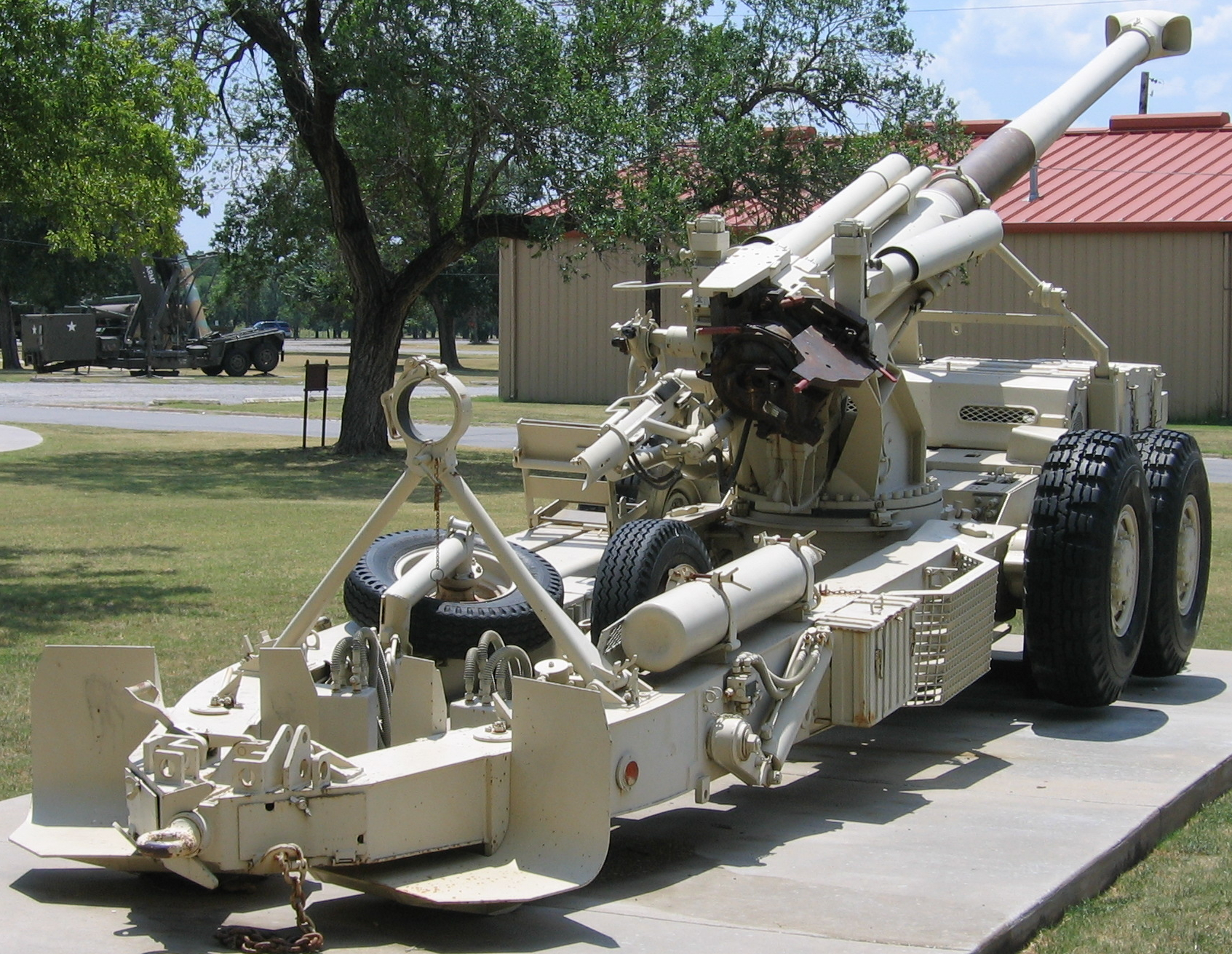
Rear view of a G5 howitzer.

A small SADF force continued to harry the FAPLA in the Tumpo region, to create the impression that the full force was still present, and to prevent the FAPLA from resuming their advance against UNITA. For months it continued to shell Cuito Cuanavale and the airstrip across the river using their long-range G-5 artillery from a distance of 30 to 40 km. This continued until the end of August, after which all SADF troops returned to South West Africa.

The Cuito airstrip was kept in repair, but since it was under constant observation by the SADF artillery and air force it could not be safely used by fixed wing aircraft.

== Weapons ==
The SADF used a mix of British, French, Israeli, captured Soviet and domestically developed weaponry. Their allies, UNITA used a mix of Soviet and South African-supplied weaponry. The United States covertly supplied UNITA guerillas with Stingers for anti-aircraft defence. The South Africans were hampered by United Nations Security Council Resolution 418, an international arms embargo that prevented them from acquiring material such as modern aircraft. The Cubans and FAPLA were armed with Soviet weaponry.

== Aftermath ==
=== 1988 Cuban offensive and peace talks ===
Before and during the battle of Cuito Cuanavale, US-brokered peace negotiations were in progress to remove all foreign belligerents from Angola. This was linked to the attempt to secure independence for Namibia. After the battles all sides resumed negotiations.

Eventually Cuban troop strength in Angola increased to about 55,000, with 40,000 deployed in the south. Due to the international arms embargo since 1977, South Africa's aging air force was outclassed by sophisticated Soviet-supplied air defence systems and air-strike capabilities fielded by the Cubans and Angolans and it was unable to uphold the air supremacy it had enjoyed for years; its loss in turn proved to be critical to the outcome of the battle on the ground.

While negotiations continued, Cuban, FAPLA and SWAPO units under General Cintras Frías opened a second front to the west at Lubango with a force of 40,000 Cuban troops and 30,000 Angolan forces, and with support from MiG-23 fighter bombers. Various engagements took place over the next three months, starting near Calueque on 15 March 1988. This eventually gave rise to Operation Excite/Hilti and Operation Displace, in which skirmishes took place in Donguena, Xangongo, Techipa and other cities. The battles in the Southwest front ended on 27 June when Cuban MiG-23s bombed Calueque Dam, killing 12 South African soldiers from 8 SAI. Just before the air attack over Calueque, a heavy combat happened in the area when 3 columns of the FAPLA/FAR forces advanced towards Calueque dam. SADF forces, composed of regulars, 32 Bn and SWATF troops, halted the Cuban offensive inflicting approximately 300 casualties among the enemy forces.

The Cubans claimed to have killed 20 SADF troops, but the clash discouraged the Cubans from undertaking further ground engagements. On 8 June 1988, the South African government issued call-ups to 140,000 men of the Citizen Force reserves, however when hostilities ceased the call-up was cancelled. Following the battles the South Africans recognised that further confrontation with the Cubans would unnecessarily escalate the conflict and with all risks considered then retired the combat groups still operating in Angola back to Namibia. On the other side, the Cubans were shocked at the heavy casualties suffered and placed their forces on maximum alert awaiting a revenge attack from the South Africans, which never came. With the withdrawal of the SADF into Namibia on 27 June (The SWATF, 701Bn, A-Coy, Platoons 1 and 2, who were dug in, in defensive positions on the hills North East of Calueque, finally withdrew over the small lower, Calueque bridge on 29 June, and at Ruacana the last elements, 32Bn and tanks, withdrew on 30 June) the hostilities ceased, and a formal peace treaty was signed at Ruacana on 22 August 1988. A peace accord, mediated by Chester Crocker, was finally signed on 22 December 1988 in New York, leading to the withdrawal of all foreign belligerents and to the independence of Namibia.

=== Casualties ===
After Operation Packer, General Johannes Geldenhuys publicly announced official SADF losses as 31 dead and 90 wounded during the entire campaign. Another 7 SADF soldiers were acknowledged as non-combat related fatalities, mostly due to accidents or friendly fire. Later South African military reports settled on 43 dead (a figure which may include SWATF personnel), as well as the loss of 3 aircraft - two Mirage F1 fighter aircraft and an unarmed AM.3 Bosbok spotter plane - along with 3 tanks, and 4 other armoured vehicles. Retired South African Brigadier General Dick Lord subsequently wrote that at least 40 SADF and SWATF personnel died during the Cuito Cuanavale campaign. The SADF and SWATF suffered 86 dead in Angola from September 1987 to May 1988, although some of these may have died in other operations or non-combat related incidents.

UNITA's armed wing FALA suffered around 3,000 dead. FALA did not disclose its number of wounded, but historian Stephen Weigert noted it was likely to be substantially higher than the number of fatalities. The heaviest FALA casualties occurred as a result of futile assaults on the entrenched FAPLA positions during Operations Hooper and Packer.

FAPLA suffered 4,768 dead, and over 10,000 wounded. Around 700 FAPLA fatalities occurred as a result of Operations Hooper and Packer, with the remainder of losses suffered during Operation Moduler. The heaviest FAPLA casualties occurred during the initial phase of South African air and artillery strikes, as well as during the disorderly withdrawal towards Cuito Cuanavale. According to the SADF, FAPLA also suffered the loss of 94 tanks, 12 MiG-21 and MiG-23 fighter aircraft, and at least 100 other vehicles destroyed, mostly trucks. Weigert asserts that FAPLA lost only 61 tanks, but the number of destroyed trucks and logistical vehicles may be as high as 400.

FAR ground forces suffered 42 confirmed dead, along with 6 tanks being destroyed. Six FAR aircraft were shot down, resulting in the deaths of 7 Cuban pilots and air crew, as well as the capture of another 3 by FALA. Cuban diplomats later negotiated successfully with UNITA representatives in the Ivory Coast to secure their release. By August 1988, FALA was holding 5 FAR personnel in captivity, including these pilots. Two of the prisoners were released that month, and the remaining 3 released in March 1989.

The ANC's armed wing, MK, which had never previously participated in a conventional engagement, suffered 100 dead. Most of the MK cadres were killed in FALA ambushes while providing security for FAPLA's rear areas. Two were captured by FALA, which offered to swap them in exchange for UNITA party members imprisoned in neighbouring Zambia. The Zambian government rejected the proposal, but FALA later released the MK personnel in October 1988 under pressure from the International Committee of the Red Cross.

The Soviet military mission suffered 3 dead. Another 5 Soviet advisers were wounded.

=== Legacy ===
The battle was tactically inconclusive, but both sides declared victory. FAPLA and its Cuban allies declared victory because they were able to hold their defenses around Cuito Cuanavale. UNITA and its South African allies declared victory because the initial FAPLA offensive had been shattered and the participating enemy brigades had suffered heavy losses.

Fidel Castro claimed that "the overwhelming victory at Cuito Cuanavale...put an end to outside military aggression against [Angola]," asserting that South Africa had suffered such a catastrophic setback as a result of the battle that it "had to swallow its usual arrogant bullying and sit down at the negotiating table". On a visit to Cuba, Nelson Mandela told the Cuban people that the FAPLA-Cuban "success" at Cuito Cuanavale was "a turning point for the liberation of our continent and my people" as well as the Angolan civil war and the struggle for Namibian independence.

Soviet foreign policy expert Peter Vanneman stated that no decisive victory was won by either side. In his analysis of the campaign, Fen Osler Hampson, Director of Global Security Research at the Centre for International Governance Innovation, concurred with this perspective. Hampson asserted that "although there was no decisive battle at Cuito Cuanavale, Cuban president Fidel Castro successfully exploited the situation for propaganda purposes". Hampson criticised Cuban sources for painting the battle as a single decisive engagement, asserting instead that the battle was better described as a prolonged stalemate in which two modestly sized opposing forces kept each other in check for nine months.

Retired US Marine Corps colonel and military analyst Andrew Gourgoumis found that while "South Africa attained some tactical objectives by defeating the FAPLA offensive and denying FAPLA the ability to immediately resume the attack by the end of the SADF campaign", it suffered a strategic failure by failing to completely drive FAPLA west across the Cuito river, and in doing so granted the latter a "moral and symbolic victory". However, Gourgoumis also found that the SADF campaign achieved one of South Africa's major diplomatic objectives by applying renewed pressure on the Soviet, Angolan, and Cuban governments to seek a negotiated end to the conflict.

American historian Daniel Spikes commented that the Battle of Cuito Cuanavale exhausted both sides equally, and resulted in a "simmering stasis of frustrating, dead-end stalemate. This time, however, the too oft repeated demonstration that no one side could prevail against its adversaries (and its adversaries' allies) had finally pried open the eyes of all the foreign parties to the war...at last, the United States and the Soviet Union decided to cooperate with one another to resolve [the] impasse." Spikes states that shortly after the campaign ended, both the US and Soviet governments took the opportunity to apply renewed pressure on their respective allies to seek peace.

While acknowledging that the final SADF and UNITA offensives were unsuccessful, Jeffrey Herbst, a political scientist at Princeton University, remarked:

However, despite the claims of many that the [FAPLA and Cuban] defense was a striking victory, Cuito Cuanavale was not a defeat of the South Africans. The battle did little more than prevent the Angolan army from being destroyed and restore the military situation to the status quo ante bellum. Cuito Cuanavale was not the Cubans' Stalingrad; rather it was the Angolans' Dunkirk.

A summary of the battle in Krasnaya Zvezda, the official periodical of the Soviet Ministry of Defence, noted that the FAPLA-Cuban coalition had failed to "decisively defeat the enemy" and described the result as "frankly speaking, an impasse".

== See also ==
- Cuban intervention in Angola
- List of operations of the South African Border War

== Notes and references ==
=== References ===
- Benemelis, Juan (1988). Las Guerras Secretas de Fidel Castro. Fundación Elena Mederos. ISBN 978-1-890829-21-6.
- Bole-Richard, Michel (23 January 1988). "Angola: une importante garnison gouvernementale serait sur le point de tomber aux mains de l'UNITA". Le Monde (in French). p. 5.
- Cock, Jacklyn; Nathan, Laurie (1989). War and Society: the Militarisation of South Africa. New Africa Books. ISBN 978-0-86486-115-3.
- Crocker, Chester A. (1992). High Noon in Southern Africa: Making Peace in a Rough Neighborhood. W. W. Norton. ISBN 978-0-393-03432-5.
- George, Edward (2005). The Cuban Intervention in Angola, 1965–1991. London, New York: Frank Cass. ISBN 978-0-415-35015-0.
- Gleijeses, Piero (11 July 2007). "Cuito Cuanavale revisited: analysis". Mail & Guardian Online. Archived from the original on 14 July 2007.
- Holt, C. (2005). At Thy Call We Did Not Falter. Zebra Press. ISBN 978-1-77007-117-9.
- Jaster, Robert S. (1990). The 1988 Peace Accords and the Future of South-western Africa. Adelphi Papers. Vol. 253. The International Institute for Strategic Studies, London. ISBN 978-0-08-040974-0.
- Maier, Karl (1996). Angola: Promises and Lies. London: Serif. ISBN 978-1-897959-22-0.
- Marcum, John (1990). "South Africa and the Angola-Namibia Agreement". In Owen Ellison Kahn (ed.). Disengagement from Southwest Africa: The Prospects for Peace in Angola and Namibia. New Brunswick: University of Miami Institute for Soviet and East European Studies. ISBN 978-0-88738-361-8.
- Martin, James W.; Broadhead, Susan Herlin (2004). Historical Dictionary of Angola (2nd ed.). Scarecrow Press. ISBN 978-0-8108-4940-2.
- McFaul, Michael (1990). "Rethinking the "Reagan Doctrine" in Angola". International Security. 14 (3): 99–135. doi:10.2307/2538933. JSTOR 2538933. S2CID 154628099.
- Mills, Greg; Williams, David (2006). Seven Battles that Shaped South Africa. Cape Town: Tafelberg. ISBN 978-0-624-04298-3.
- Niddrie, David (1988). "Angola: The siege of Cuito Cuanavale". Africa Confidential. 29 (3).
- Nortje, Piet (2003). 32 Battalion. Cape Town: Struik Publishers. ISBN 978-1-86872-914-2.
- Pazzanita, Anthony (1991). "The conflict resolution process in Angola". Journal of Modern African Studies. 29 (1): 83–114. doi:10.1017/s0022278x00020759. JSTOR 160994. S2CID 145255649.
- Radu, Michael; Arnold, Anthony (1990). The New Insurgencies: Anticommunist Guerrillas in the Third World. Transaction Publishers. ISBN 978-0-88738-307-6.
- Ricardo Luis, Roger (1989). Prepárense a vivir: Crónicas de Cuito Cuanavale. Havana: Editora Politica.
- Scholtz, Leopold (15 May 2013). The SADF in the Border War 1966–1989. Cape Town: Tafelberg (NB Publishers). ISBN 9780624054108. Archived from the original on 17 October 2014.
- Trainor, Bernard E. (12 July 1988). "South Africa's strategy on Angola falls short, enhancing Cubans' role". The New York Times.
- Treaster, Joseph B. (28 July 1988). "Castro faults Soviet tactics in war in Angola". The New York Times.
- Truth and Reconciliation Commission (29 October 1998). Truth and Reconciliation Commission of South Africa Report (PDF) (Report). Vol. 2. Archived from the original (PDF) on 4 November 2009.
- Vanneman, Peter (1990). "Soviet foreign policy for Angola/Namibia in the 1980s: a strategy of coercive diplomacy". In Owen Ellison Kahn (ed.). Disengagement from Southwest Africa: The Prospects for Peace in Angola and Namibia. New Brunswick: University of Miami Institute for Soviet and East European Studies. pp. 69–94. ISBN 978-0-88738-361-8.
- Walker, John Frederick (2004). A Certain Curve of Horn: The Hundred-Year Quest for the Giant Sable Antelope. Grove Press. ISBN 978-0-8021-4068-5.
