= South African Defence Review 2012 =

The South African Defence Review of 2012 was a policy review conducted by a panel of experts and chaired by retired politician and former Minister of Defence, Roelf Meyer. The review was commissioned by Lindiwe Sisulu the then Minister of Defence and Military Veterans, in July 2011. The review was motivated by the need to correct errors and shortcomings of the previous review.

== The 1998 Defence Review and its consequences ==
The South African Defence Review of 1998, performed by management consultants from Deloitte and Touche and which forms the basis of the current defence policy, resulted in a number of serious problems:

- Aging lower rank and medically unfit personnel cannot be discharged due to enlistment contracts based on civil service employment principles.
- Inadequate provision for expeditionary/foreign deployment capacity. The review assumed the SANDF would not perform any foreign deployments. However, the reality is that the SANDF has been and still is heavily engaged in United Nations and African Union peacekeeping and enforcement operations (see the United Nations Force Intervention Brigade for example) in numerous countries in Sub-Saharan Africa. This oversight has necessitated expensive chartering of foreign civilian heavy airlifters to support deployed troops.
- "Corporate-like" structure not suited to military operational requirements - The South African Army's brigade and divisional structures were abolished and replaced by separate "formations" and classified by role such as infantry, armour, intelligence, training, artillery, engineers, etc. This created a "silo" structural system which complicated and hindered interaction and integration of the different formations. According to Deane-Peter Baker of the South African Institute for Security Studies, the D&T plan, "while alleviating to an extent, the mistrust of the new South African leadership of the remaining apartheid-era South African Defence Force personnel in middle management positions, reduced the combat effectiveness of the Army" and by 2011 was seen as a mistake. The decision to limit the force's design of the SANDF to rely on short logistic lines for highly mechanised mobile forces in defence of national territory, which caused many supply issues during modern foreign deployments, was also considered a mistake. This is one of the major problems for the army and various solutions are being considered by the government to better equip forces deployed in out-of-area SANDF project operations.
- "Top heavy" command structure (generals/troops ratio too high)

According to defence minister Lindiwe Sisulu, the old report was no longer relevant to South Africa's current situation.

== Mandate and terms of reference ==
The committee's first meeting with Minister Sisulu was on 13 July 2011 at the Castle of Good Hope in Cape Town.

== Review organisation ==
The review body was organized into two components, the review committee and a resource group. The minister faced criticism due to the inclusion of Tony Yengeni in the committee as Yengeni had been convicted and sentenced for fraud relating to arms acquisition processes in the 1990s.

The following members were included in the review organisation:

=== Committee ===
- Roelf Meyer (chairperson) - former Minister of Defence, former Minister of Constitutional Development, and Chair of Armscor
- Thandi Modise (deputy chairperson) - Premier of the North West Province and former chair of the Parliamentary Portfolio Committee on Defence (1998-2004)
- Phandelani Mathoma - General Manager of Corporate Affairs for Old Mutual.
- Tony Yengeni - Former Member of Parliament and Chief Whip of the ruling African National Congress. (Note: A controversial member of the committee as he was convicted and sentenced for corruption related to his role in arms purchases during the late 1990s.)
- Nonkonzo Molai - Deputy Director-General: Military Veterans Empowerment and Stakeholder Relations in the Department of Military Veterans and later South African ambassador to Italy.
- Charles Nqakula - former Minister of Defence.
- Godfrey Giles - Lieutenant Colonel, Chair of the Council of Military Veterans' Organisations.

=== Resource group ===
- Phillip Schöultz - Rear Admiral, South African Navy, former Director Joint Operations of the SANDF (Note: Retired from the SAN in January 2014 while still serving on the review committee.)
- John Gibbs - Brigadier General, Deputy Chief Director Defence Reserves.
- Nick Sendall - Major, SANDF. (Note: As of 1995, part of SANDF communications service.)
- Khanyile Moses - Former provincial police commissioner of KwaZulu-Natal.
- Helmoed Heitman - Defence analyst and journalist
- Tefo Keketsi - Defence analyst at Armscor.

== First consultative draft ==
The first draft document, forming the basis of the public consultation process, was released on 12 April 2012.

=== Immediate capability enhancements ===
Immediate capability enhancements that are required to ensure that the SANDF can adequately perform its missions were identified in the consultative draft of the defence review.

==== Special forces ====
The South African Special Forces require additional weapons and systems, including a small number of dedicated aircraft for insertion/extraction missions. Additional units should be created for specialised missions.

==== Border security ====
The following needs were identified to ensure the SANDF can adequately defend South African borders.

- Agile and protected patrol vehicles.
- Surveillance equipment including unmanned aerial vehicles (UAVs), particularly micro-UAVs. Mobile and fixed acoustic, optronic and radar monitoring systems.
- A "backbone" communications system integrated with tactical air, ground and police communication systems.
- Various types of non-lethal weapons.
- A system to collate data for intelligence led operations.

==== Air Space Surveillance and Protection ====
The review found that static, mobile and airborne radar systems to track low-flying aircraft, and aircraft with the capability to intercept low and slow flying target aircraft were required in order for the SANDF to enhance its air surveillance and protection capabilities.

==== Extended Maritime Security Capability ====
Somali-based piracy expanding into the Mozambique channel had been identified as a risk and an urgent reason to expand South Africa's maritime capability. Immediate requirements for maritime patrol aircraft, offshore patrol vessels, additional shipboard helicopters and shoreline patrol equipment were identified.

==== Crisis Response Capability ====
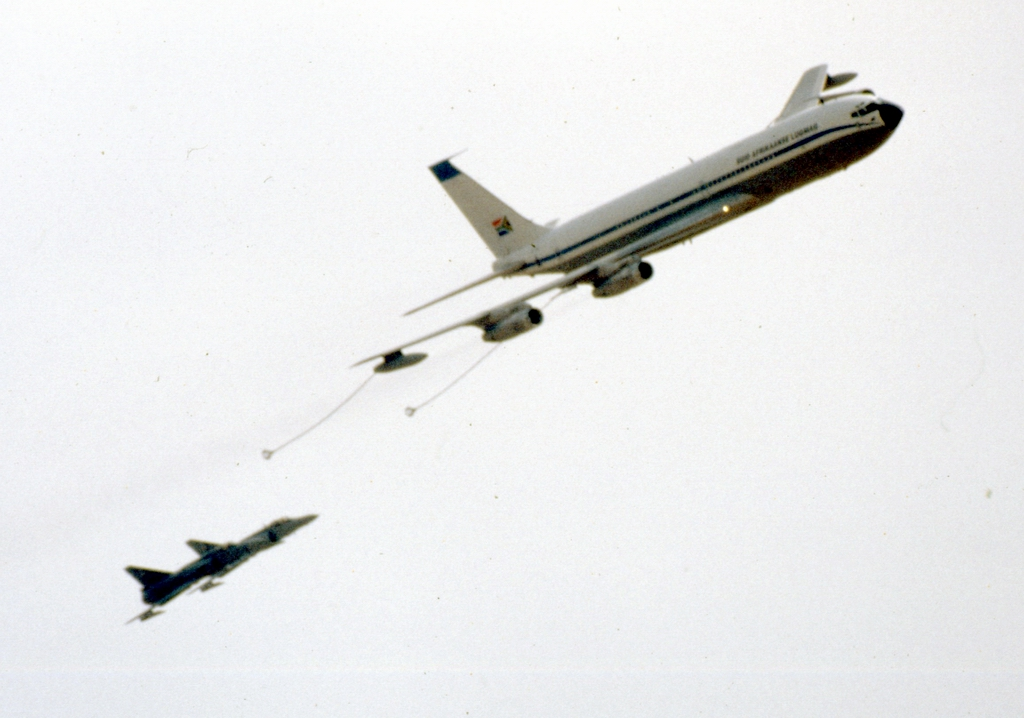
The SAAF's Boeing 707s, previously used for in-flight refuelling, were retired in 2007.

The following requirements were identified to enable the SANDF to fulfill South Africa's regional security responsibilities:

- Equipment and weapons for parachute and air-landed battalion groups.
- A rejuvenation and expansion of medium airlift capability.
- Heavy/long range aircraft that when combined with medium airlift aircraft, will allow the Defence Force to deploy a parachute battalion group or an air-landed battalion group within 48 hours from South Africa to anywhere within the Southern African Development Community (SADC) region, or from a forward base within the continental SADC region to anywhere in an adjoining country.
- The establishment of in-flight refuelling capabilities to enable effective fighter support for crisis response deployments and to extend the reach of the Special Forces.

=== Urgent capability enhancements ===
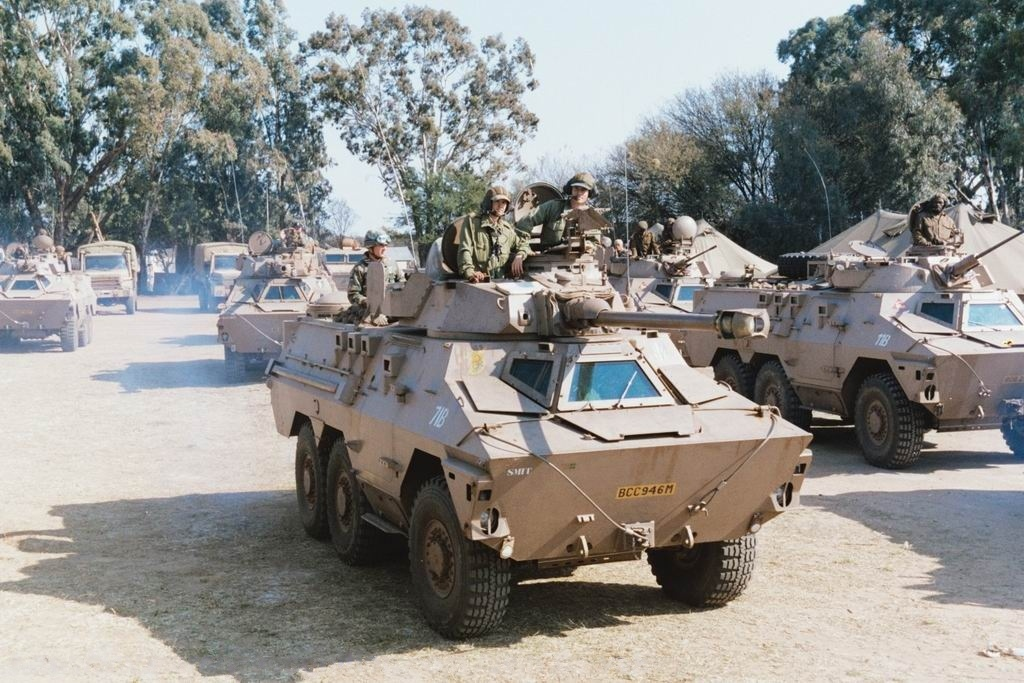
A Ratel IFV, in service since 1977.

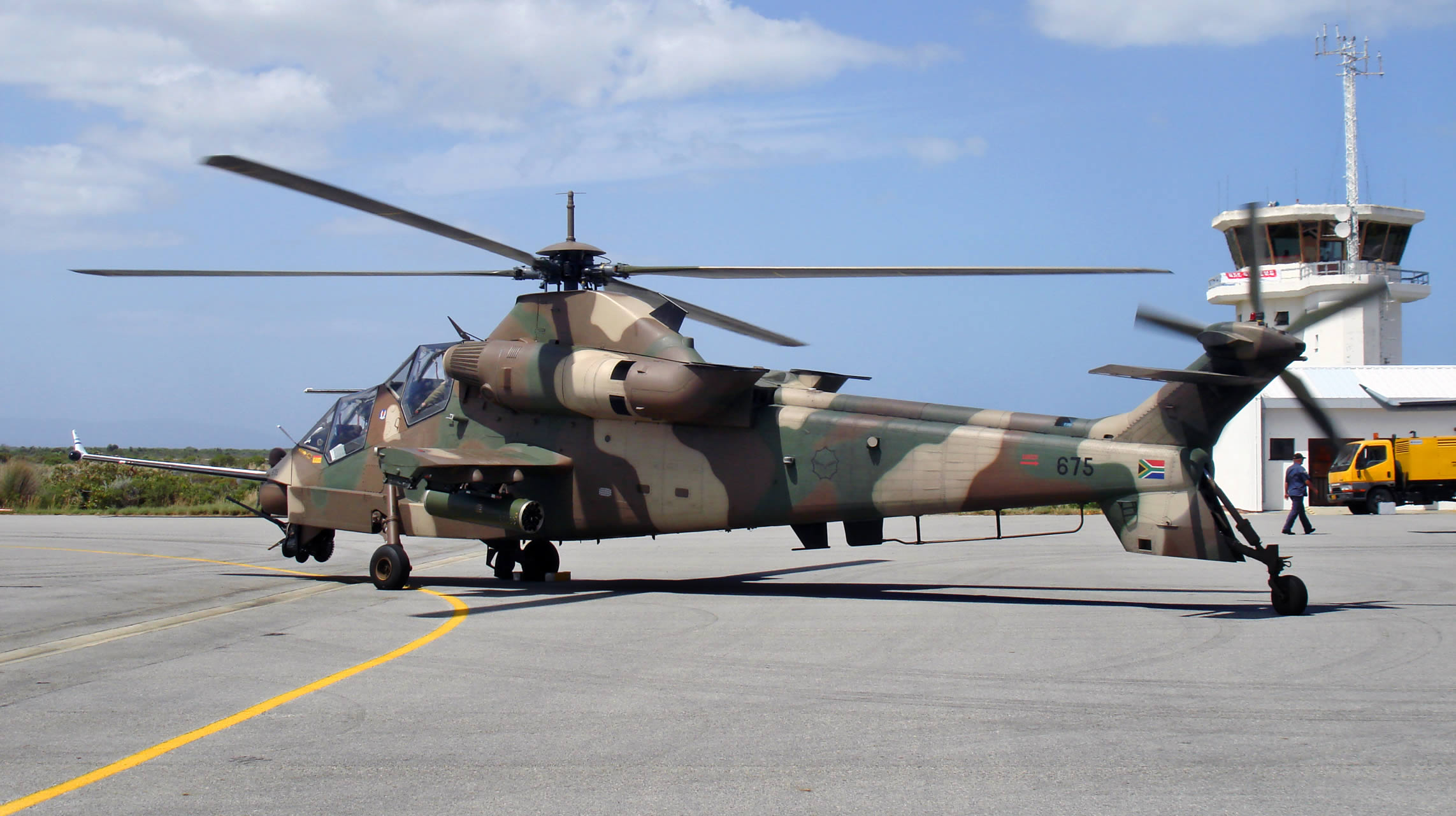
As of 2014, the South African built Denel Rooivalk has still not received its Mokopa anti-tank guided missiles due to a lack of funding.

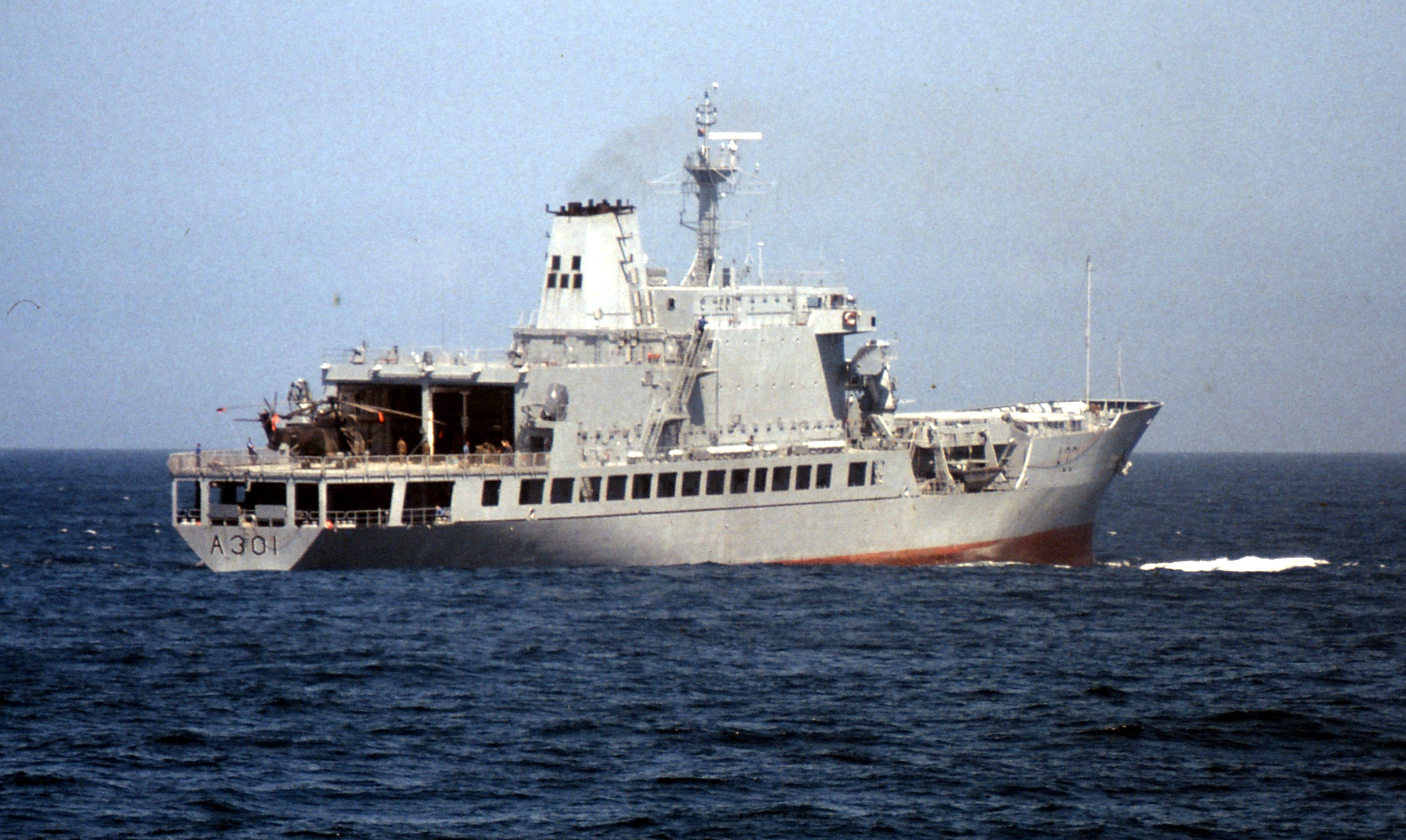
The SAS Drakensberg (A301), in service since 1987

Various areas were identified by the review in which the SANDF lacked adequate capability to perform near/medium term missions. Obsolete equipment that needed to be replaced in order for the SANDF to retain its capabilities were identified.

==== Infantry Combat Vehicles ====
Infantry combat vehicles are suited to peacekeeping missions. The 30-year-old Ratel IFV was identified as being obsolete, making maintenance difficult. It was suggested that they be replaced urgently.

==== Armoured Personnel Carriers ====
The Casspir and Mamba APC vehicles were identified as obsolete and in urgent need of replacement. The Mfezi Ambulance is also in need of replacement. A need for Mine-Resistant Ambush Protected patrol vehicles has arisen.

==== Logistic Vehicles ====
The currently used SAMIL Trucks were identified as obsolete and in need of replacement.

==== Light Artillery ====
Recent conflicts in Africa have proven that light artillery that can be deployed quickly if needed. A 105mm long-range gun and ammunition family has been under development by Denel Land Systems since 2012.

==== Aerial Weapons ====
Weapons for the JAS-39 Gripen, BAe Hawk and Denel Rooivalk are needed in order for them to be operated effectively.

==== Combat Support Ships ====
It was identified that future operations of the South African Navy might be extended to the Mozambique Channel. The SAS Drakensberg (A301) was identified for replacement.

=== Force support requirements ===
Requirements for essential supporting equipment were also included in the consultative review. It was identified that there was a lot of obsolete or unsuitable equipment. This included water purification, field kitchen, field accommodation equipment, obsolete field workshop equipment and old field hospital equipment. The need for the re-establishment of a tactical airfield unit capability for the Air Force, in order to operate aircraft away from bases was also identified. The acquisition of munitions and explosives to allow rebuilding of ammunition stocks and effective live-fire and explosives training was also highlighted.

== Public consultation process ==
The Public Participation Programme (PPP) consisted of a series of public meetings and consultations with stakeholder organisations at various venues around the country:

Date	Event	Stakeholder / PPP venue	City / Province
18 April 2012	Initial meeting	Portfolio Committee on Defence and Military Veterans, Parliament	Cape Town, Western Cape
21 April 2012	PPP	Sport Stadium Tongaat	Tongaat, KwaZulu-Natal
24/25 April 2012	Stakeholder engagement	Institute for Security Studies (ISS)	Pretoria
3 May 2012	Stakeholder engagement	Centre for Conflict Resolution (CCR)	Cape Town
5 May 2012	PPP	OR Tambo Hall - Ikageng	Potchefstroom, North West Province
8/9 May 2012	Stakeholder engagement	Africa Centre for the Constructive Resolution of Disputes (ACCORD)	Durban
26 May 2012	PPP	Moses Twebe Great Hall	Dimbaza, Eastern Cape
29 May 2012	Academic round table	University of the Free State	Bloemfontein
30 May 2012	Academic round table	University of the Witwatersrand	Johannesburg
1 June 2012	Industry round table	Aerospace, Maritime and Defence Industries Association of South Africa (AMD)	Pretoria
7 June 2012	CSIR round table	Council for Scientific and Industrial Research (CSIR)	Pretoria
8/9 June 2012	PPP	The Hoyo Hoyo High School	Bushbuckridge, Mpumalanga
12 June 2012	PPP	Pabalello	Upington, Northern Cape
23 June 2012	PPP	Aganang Community Hall	Polokwane, Limpopo
18 July 2012	Stakeholder engagement	University of Pretoria Gender Forum	Pretoria
23 July 2012	Academic round table	Nelson Mandela Metropolitan University	Port Elizabeth
15 Aug 2012	PPP	Walter Sisulu Square	Kliptown, Gauteng
16 Aug 2012	Stakeholder engagement	Mapungubwe Institute for Strategic Reflection, Developmental Agenda	Johannesburg
15 Sep 2012	PPP	Nomzamo Community Hall	Strand, Western Cape

=== Written submissions ===
The committee received written submissions from various individuals and organisations.

== Second draft ==
The second draft, based on the first, but with changes as informed by input received through the public consultation process was published on 7 September 2012. Many of the changes were criticized by the pacifist civil society organisation, the Ceasefire Campaign, who said the proposed expansion of the defence force and increased expenditure was unnecessary as South Africa does not face any credible threat of conventional war.

=== Second edition of the Second Draft ===
A second edition of this draft was published on 6 November 2012. This was to make a number of "technical changes" after discussions with the Minister of Defence and Military Veterans, the Defence Secretariat Council and the Military Command Council.

== Third draft ==
This draft was published on 10 April 2013. The draft recognised that South Africa was a significant military force in Southern Africa, however it is not considered as one of the world's major military forces.

== Final version ==
The final edition, renamed the "2014" review due to the delay in publication, was accepted by Cabinet and submitted to Parliament in May 2014. The main points covered in the over 400-page document are:

The Defence Review identified 4 main goals of the SANDF:

1. Defend and Protect South Africa
2. Safeguard South Africa
3. Promote Peace & Security
4. Developmental & other tasks

To meet these goals the Review identified a number of Required Defence Capabilities:

- Joint Command and Control
- Defence Diplomacy
- Special Forces
- Special Operations forces
- Medium-Combat forces - configured and maintained as a projectable, multi-roled medium-combat capability with enhanced fire-power, manoeuvreability and protection making it suitable for a range of contingencies.
- Heavy-Combat forces - to deter South Africa's potential adversaries and conduct landward operations in high-threat situations and to augment the Medium-Combat forces
- Maritime Operations
- Air Operations
- Military Health
- Information Warfare capability

Realising that the cost of implementing all of the recommendations was immense, the Review recommended 5 Planning milestones for implementing the Review's recommendations:

- Planning Milestone 1: Arrest the decline in critical capabilities through immediate, directed interventions.
- Planning Milestone 2: Re-balance and re-organise the Defence Force as the foundation for future growth.
- Planning Milestone 3: Create a sustainable Defence Force that can meet current ordered defence commitments.
- Planning Milestone 4: Enhance the Defence Force's capacity to respond to nascent challenges in the strategic environment.
- Planning Milestone 5: Defend the Republic against insurgency and/or armed conflict to the level of limited war.

=== Force Design ===
The Review proposed a re-organisation of the combat forces.

==== Army ====
It is proposed that operational forces be grouped under a Land Command, with the combat elements organized into brigades grouped into three divisions, each of which has a specific operational focus. In addition, some specialized elements will be under direct command of the Land Command.: The three divisions are:

1. Mechanised Division
2. Motorised Division
3. Contingency or Special Operations Division

As a short term measure it is recommended that the South African Army consolidate its existing force structure into a Land Command comprising one Division and two Brigades:

1. A motorised division.
2. A contingency (special operations) brigade.
3. A mechanised brigade.

== Response ==
The review, having been accepted by cabinet and renamed The "2014" Review, was submitted to parliament after the general election in May 2014. In September 2014, it was reported that official opposition, the Democratic Alliance shadow minister of defence and military veterans, David Maynier and defence analyst, Helmoed Heitman had expressed concerns with the delays the review was getting and said that dealing with and implementing the defence review was a matter of urgency. By October 2014 the Joint Standing Committee on Defence and Military Veterans had been established with the responsibility to take the review as input to eventually produce a new defence policy.

== Research papers ==
During the review a number of essays were produced by members of the review structure. These documents were used to inform the process.

- Research Essay on a South African Methodology to Determine Level of Defence Ambition
- Research Essay on Changes to South African Defence Policy Since 1910
- Research Essay on Climate Change
- Research Essay on Cyber Warfare
- Research Essay on Defence Ambition, Concept & Capabilities
- Research Essay on International Defence Policy & Strategy Experiences
- Research Essay on Private Military Companies & Mercenarism
- Research Essay on Resources & Conflict
- Research Essay on Security Sector Reform
- Research Essay on the International Credit Crunch and Defence Spending
