= Operation Hooper =

1987–88 operation by South African Defence Force in the South African Border War

- Part of the Battle of Cuito Cuanavale
- Operation Hooper (Angola)
Location	Cuito Cuanavale, Angola
Result	Inconclusive

Belligerents
South Africa: South African Defence Force; UNITA	(Angola) MPLA: People's Armed Forces for the Liberation of Angola; Cuba (Soviet Union) Soviet advisers

Commanders and leaders
(South Africa) Colonel Deon Ferreira; Jonas Savimbi	General António França (Soviet Union) General Pyotr Gusev (Cuba) Unknown

Units involved
61 Mechanised Battalion & 62 Mechanised Battalion Group (4 SAI)	21 Brigade; 25 Brigade; 59 Brigade

Strength
2,000; 24 tanks	unknown

Casualties and losses
South Africa: 8 killed 22 wounded 3+ armoured vehicles damaged UNITA: 4+ killed 18 wounded	FAPLA: 150 killed/captured 33 tanks destroyed 11+ armoured vehicles destroyed Cuba: 42+ killed Soviet Union: 2 wounded

Operation Hooper was a military operation between 1987 and 1988 by the South African Defence Force (SADF) during the South African Border War. This operation forms part of what has come to be called the Battle of Cuito Cuanavale. The Cubans' objective was securing the town of Cuito Cuanavale on the west of the river from capture. The SADF objective was to drive the People's Armed Forces for the Liberation of Angola (FAPLA) west across the river or to destroy them, so as to ensure that FAPLA was no longer a threat to the National Union for the Total Independence of Angola (UNITA) in the south-east. The FAPLA advance was permanently halted, UNITA lived to fight on for another 15 years. The SADF never attempted to capture the town. Both sides claimed victory.

== Background ==
Directly following on from Operation Moduler, by November 1987 the SADF had cornered the remnants of three FAPLA units on the east of the Cuito River, across from the town itself and was poised to destroy them. The quite demoralised 59 FAPLA motorised infantry brigade, 21 and 25 FAPLA light infantry brigades, in positions near Tumpo and east of the Cuito River, were effectively cut off due to SADF artillery control of both the bridge and airstrip and to UNITA guerrilla control of the road from Menongue, which they had mined and were prepared to ambush.

With no functioning armour or artillery remaining, the FAPLA units faced annihilation. On 15 November, the Angolan government requested urgent military assistance from Cuba. This was done on the advice of FAPLA's chief Soviet military adviser Pyotr Gusev, who recognised that unless immediate reinforcements were forthcoming the FAPLA lines would likely collapse.

On 25 November, the UN Security Council demanded the SADF's unconditional withdrawal from Angola by 10 December 1987 but without threatening any sanctions.

== Cuban objectives ==
In the opinion of Cuba's leader, Fidel Castro, a South African victory would have meant not only the capture of Cuito and the destruction of the best Angolan military formations, but, quite probably, the end of Angola's existence as an independent country. Thus Castro responded immediately by sending — in what was called "Maniobra XXXI Aniversario de las FAR" — materiel and 15,000 elite troops, retaking the initiative from the Soviets. The first Cuban reinforcements in Cuito arrived by helicopter on 5 December 1987 with about 160–200 technicians, advisers, officers, and special forces. The deployment of regular ground forces was authorised on the condition that the Angolan Ministry of Defence allow Cuban general officers to supervise and lead all future combat operations around Cuito Cuanavale. This effectively sidelined FAPLA's Soviet advisers, who had been previously in charge of operational planning.

General Arnaldo Ochoa, a veteran of the 1976 Angola campaign and of tank battles in Ethiopia, was made overall commander of the forces on the government side. Ochoa and Castro were to have serious disagreements in the conduct of the war in Angola. These tensions were to have repercussions both during the war where Castro's interference with defense plans may have cost the Cubans dozens of lives and in the aftermath of Angolan hostilities a year later when Ochoa was arrested, tried and executed by firing squad after being found guilty of treason. General Cintras Frias was made commander at Cuito Cuanavale. The Cubans' initial priority was securing Cuito Cuanavale, but while reinforcements were arriving at the besieged garrison they made preparations for a second front to the west of Cuito Cuanavale in Lubango where the SADF had been operating unhindered for 8 years.

== South African objectives ==
=== Objective 1 ===
Directly following on from Operation Moduler, Operation Hooper's objective was defined as being to destroy the enemy east of the river or at least to drive them back across the river, inflicting maximum casualties but suffering minimum losses of their own.

=== Objective 2 ===
The river crossings were to be fortified and handed over to UNITA, and the SADF were to withdraw from Angola as soon as that was achieved.

=== Restrictions ===
The order was that the town of Cuito Cuanavale would not be attacked unless it fell into SADF hands almost without a fight.

The SADF units received fresh troops and equipment, but the units were reduced to about 2,000 men and 24 tanks for the rest of the operation. The new arrivals had to be acclimatised first.

== Engagement ==
The bombardment started on 2 January 1988, with a mix of artillery and air strikes, and a UNITA infantry attack that failed. On 3 January, the SADF destroyed the important bridge across the Cuito River using a smart bomb. The Cubans managed to construct a wooden footbridge in its place which they baptised Patria o Muerte (fatherland or death). They partly buried disabled tanks so that their turrets could be used as fixed artillery pieces.

The 32 Battalion and elements of other units harried the road convoys for weeks, destroying several hundred tanks and other vehicles, and inflicting an unknown number of casualties.

On 13 January, the SADF attacked the 21 Brigade, starting with air strikes and artillery bombardments. Over two days the FAPLA unit was driven out of their positions, and lost 7 tanks with 5 more captured, various other vehicles were destroyed and captured, and 150 men were killed or captured. UNITA lost 4 dead and 18 wounded, and the SADF had one man wounded and one armoured vehicle damaged. However the SADF was again unable to exploit the momentum, due to a shortage or reserves and supplies. UNITA occupied the captured positions, and the SADF withdrew, but UNITA lost the positions later to a FAPLA counter-attack. A large Cuban and FAPLA column was on the way from Menongue for the relief of Cuito Cuanavale, but progress in the rainy season was slow due to the need to clear the UNITA minefields and guard against possible ambushes. They did not reach Cuito Cuanavale in time to take part in the first engagement.

The next attack was only on 14 February, against the positions of 21 Brigade that UNITA had lost, and the neighbouring positions of the 59 Brigade. They were counter-attacked by Cuban tanks. Both 21 Brigade and 59 Brigade were forced to withdraw. The FAPLA lost 500 men and a further 32 Cuban soldiers, along with 15 tanks and 11 armoured vehicles. The SADF lost 4 killed and 11 wounded, and some vehicles were damaged. FAPLA withdrew to the Tumpo (river) triangle, a smaller area east of the river and across from Cuito Cuanavale. The terrain was ideally suited to defence, and they laid extensive minefields.

In a skirmish on 19 February 1988 a FAPLA position was disrupted, and it resulted in the FAPLA 59 Brigade being withdrawn across the river. However the SADF had two vehicles damaged in the minefield. In the following days the Cubans stepped up their air attacks against South African positions. On 25 February another assault on the bridgehead ran into a minefield, and bogged down. In this engagement the FAPLA lost 172 men, plus 10 Cubans, and 6 tanks. In comparison the SADF lost 4 killed and 10 wounded, plus several vehicles damaged.

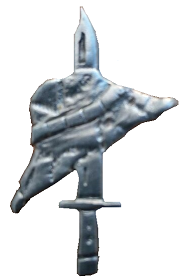
SADF Operation Hooper participation bar

=== Operation results ===
The bridgehead survived, and the objective of clearing all of the Angolans from the east side of the river had still not been achieved. This concluded Operation Hooper. It was then succeeded by the brief Operation Packer.

== See also ==
- 32 Battalion (South Africa)
- Angolan Civil War/South African Border War
- List of operations of the South African Border War
