= Pyotr Gusev (soldier) =

Soviet army general and politician

Pyotr Ivanovich Gusev
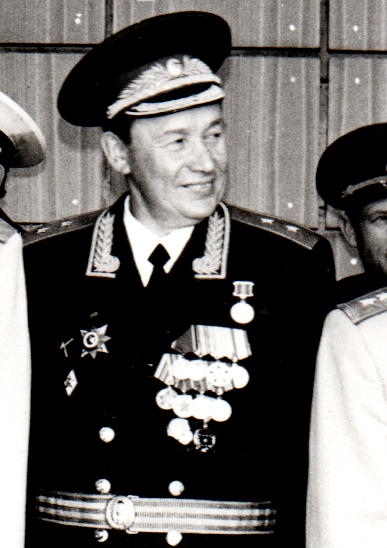
- Pyotr Gusev in 1982.
- Native name: Пётр Иванович Гусев
- Born: 1 August 1932; Nizhny Umetgurt, Udmurt Autonomous Soviet Socialist Republic
- Died: 1 October 2024 (aged 92) Udmurt Republic, Russia
- Allegiance: Soviet Union (1958–1991); Russia (1991–1993)
- Branch: Soviet Army; Russian Ground Forces
- Service years: 1958–1993
- Rank: Lieutenant general
- Commands: Carpathian Military District (deputy commander)
- Conflicts: South African Border War; Angolan Civil War; Battle of Cuito Cuanavale
- Awards: Order of the Red Banner; Order of the Red Star; Order "For Service to the Homeland in the Armed Forces of the USSR"

Pyotr Ivanovich Gusev (Russian: Пётр Иванович Гусев) (August 1, 1932 – October 1, 2024) was a Soviet and Russian career soldier. During the mid-1980s, Gusev was a lieutenant general serving as deputy commander of the Carpathian Military District.

Gusev was subsequently appointed head of the Soviet military mission in Angola in 1987, succeeding Lieutenant General Leonid Kuzmenko. In this role, Gusev directly planned and supervised combat operations for the People's Armed Forces of Liberation of Angola (FAPLA), with the oversight of Angolan Defence Minister Pedro Pedalé. He was the senior Soviet general officer involved in Operation Saluting October, and the resulting Battle of Cuito Cuanavale. Throughout the battle, Gusev personally briefed Angolan president José Eduardo dos Santos on the military situation. Aside from his involvement in that campaign, Gusev also oversaw a number of major organisational improvements to FAPLA, particularly among its armoured forces.

Although held in extremely high regard by his Angolan counterparts, Gusev was a more controversial figure among the Soviet personnel in Angola. He often vetoed commendations for Soviet enlisted personnel and junior officers who had been directly engaged in hostilities. The Soviet troops primarily served in technical and support roles, although circumstances often dictated they fight alongside their Angolan peers if attacked by UNITA insurgents or South African expeditionary forces. Gusev also garnered criticism for ordering offensives without taking into account the logistical challenges and technical shortcomings of the Angolan forces expected to execute these complex operations.

Gusev published his memoirs after his retirement from military service.

For a number of years, Gusev was consistently misidentified in the South African and Western press as Lieutenant General "Konstantin Shaganovich" for unknown reasons. Gusev's command decisions in Angola were frequently attributed to "Shaganovich", but according to South African historians Willem Steenkamp and Helmoed-Römer Heitman, as well as Russian historian Vladimir Shubin, no such individual ever served with the Soviet military mission in Angola. Where and how the original misidentification occurred remains a mystery.
