= Arlindo Pena Ben-Ben =

Angolan rebel and military commander (1955–1998)

- Born: Arlindo Chenda Isaac Pena; 17 November 1955; Caricoque, Portuguese Angola
- Died: 19 October 1998 (aged 42); Johannesburg, South Africa
- Cause of death: Malaria
- Relatives: Jonas Savimbi (uncle)
- Military career
- Allegiance: UNITA
- Rank: General
- Conflicts: Angolan War of Independence, Angolan Civil War

General Arlindo Pena Ben-Ben (17 November 1955 – 19 October 1998) served as the military commander of UNITA, one of the three liberation movements that fought against Portuguese colonial rule in Angola. After independence, UNITA and the FNLA fought against the MPLA in the Angolan Civil War.
