= Helmoed-Römer Heitman =

South African author, journalist, historian, military analyst

Helmoed-Römer Heitman JCD MMM
- Military career
- Allegiance: Republic of South Africa; Republic of South Africa
- Branch: South African Army; South African Army
- Service years: 1970–1996
- Awards: Military Merit Medal MMM John Chard Decoration JCD John Chard Medal Unitas (Unity) Medal

Helmoed-Römer Heitman JCD MMM is a South African author and commentator on military affairs. He was a member of the South African army reserve from 1970 to 1994. After the introduction of democratic rule in 1994 he briefly remained within the newly established SANDF until 1996.

During his career as a military advisor with direct ties to the apartheid military in the 1970s and 1980s, he penned various articles in favour of harsh and repressive "counter-insurgency" methods against members of liberation movements such as the ANC and SWAPO. In a 1977 article Heitman advocated the use of detention without trial against political dissidents and argued that habeas corpus should be suspended. In the same article he also recommended the use of deadly firepower against "agitators" at political rallies.

He is the South African correspondent for Jane's Defence Weekly.

== Awards ==
- Military Merit Medal (MMM)
- John Chard Decoration (JCD)
- John Chard Medal
- Unitas (Unity) Medal
