= People's Armed Forces of Liberation of Angola =

Former armed wing of the People's Movement for the Liberation of Angola (MPLA)

- Forças Armadas Populares de Libertação de Angola
- Flag of the People's Republic of Angola
- Founded: 1974
- Disbanded: 1993
- Service branches: People's Army for the Liberation of Angola (EPLA); People's Navy of Angola (MGPA); People's Air Force of Angola / Anti-Aircraft Defense (FAPA/DAA)

Leadership
- Commander-in-Chief: President José Eduardo dos Santos
- Minister of Defence: General Pedro Tonho Pedale (last)
- FAPLA chief of the general staff and army commander: Lieutenant General António dos Santos França (1982-1989)

Industry
- Foreign suppliers: Soviet Union

Related articles
- History: Angolan War of Independence; South African Border War; Angolan Civil War

The People's Armed Forces of Liberation of Angola (Portuguese: Forças Armadas Populares de Libertação de Angola) or FAPLA was originally the armed wing of the People's Movement for the Liberation of Angola (MPLA) but later (1975–1991) became Angola's official armed forces when the MPLA took control of the government.

Its major adversaries were the National Union for the Total Independence of Angola (UNITA), its armed wing, the Armed Forces of Liberation of Angola (FALA), and the South African Defence Force (SADF). The FAPLA fought the SADF and UNITA/FALA constantly from the 1970s, part of the Angolan Civil War and the South African Border War, including during Operation Savannah (1975-76), and Operation Sceptic (1980). The Battle of Cuito Cuanavale (1987-1988) was the largest land battle in Africa since the Second World War.

After the Bicesse Accords in 1993, the FAPLA were transformed into the Angolan Armed Forces (Forças Armadas de Angola, FAA), by the integration of UNITA and FALA members.

== History ==
In the early 1960s, the MPLA named its guerrilla forces the "People's Army for the Liberation of Angola" (Exército Popular de Libertação de Angola - EPLA). Many of its first cadres had received training in Morocco and Algeria. In January 1963, in one of its early operations, the EPLA attacked a Portuguese military post in Cabinda, killing a number of troops. During the mid-1960s and early 1970s, the EPLA operated very successfully from bases in Zambia against the Portuguese in eastern Angola. After 1972, however, the EPLA's effectiveness declined following several Portuguese victories, disputes with National Liberation Front of Angola (FNLA) forces, and the movement of about 800 guerrillas from Zambia to the Republic of Congo.

In August 1974, a few months after a military coup d'état had overthrown the Lisbon regime and proclaimed its intention of granting independence to Angola, the MPLA announced the formation of FAPLA, which replaced the EPLA. The FAPLA started with a strength of some 1,500, but by late 1976 grew staggeringly, to over 95,000. In 1974-75, '..after a period of six months, Moscow started to arm Neto's faction exclusively. The Soviet Union supplied the MPLA with $300 million worth of materiel as compared to $54 million over the previous fourteen years. The weapons that went to MPLA included AK-47 assault rifles, 120-mm mortars, 82-mm and 107-mm recoilless rifles, 37-mm and 14.5 mm antiaircraft guns..' and T-34, T-54, and PT-76 tanks. Independence was set for November 11, 1975.

By 1976, FAPLA had been transformed from lightly armed guerrilla units into a national army capable of sustained field operations. This transformation was gradual until the Soviet-Cuban intervention and ensuing UNITA insurgency, when the sudden and large-scale inflow of heavy weapons and accompanying technicians and advisers quickened the pace of institutional change.

Beginning in 1978, periodic South African incursions into southern Angola, coupled with UNITA's northward expansion in the east, forced the Angolan government to increase expenditures on Soviet military aid. Dependence also increased on military personnel from the Soviet Union, the German Democratic Republic (East Germany), and Cuba.

Unlike African states that acceded to independence by an orderly and peaceful process of institutional transfer, Angola inherited a disintegrating colonial state whose army was in retreat. The confluence of civil war, foreign intervention, and large-scale insurgency made Angola's experience unique. After independence, FAPLA had to reorganize for conventional war and counterinsurgency simultaneously and immediately to continue the new war with South Africa and UNITA. Ironically, a guerrilla army that conducted a successful insurgency for more than a decade came to endure the same kind of exhausting struggle for a similar period.

== Combat performance ==
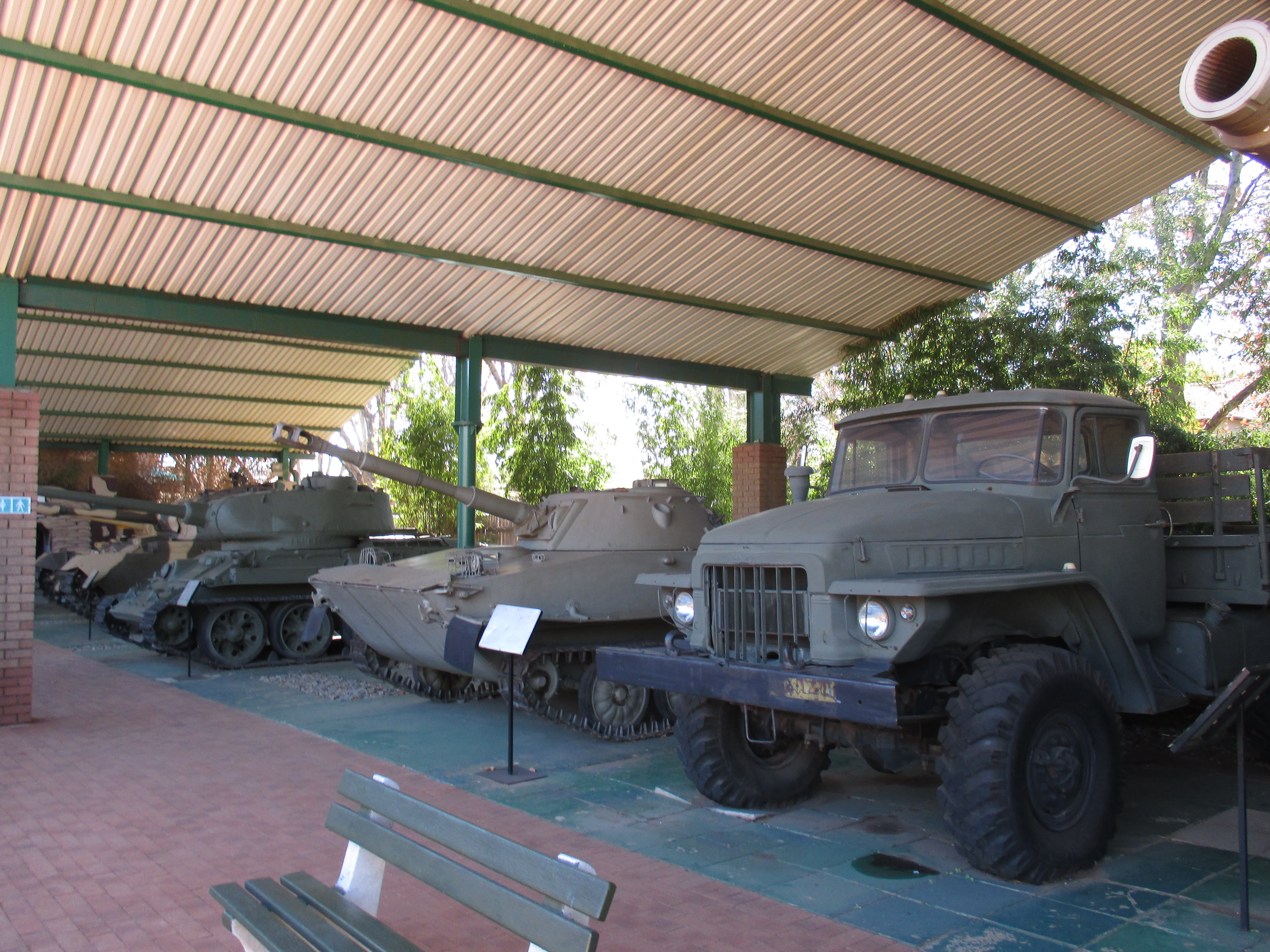
Line up of captured FAPLA combat vehicles in the South African National Museum of Military History: Ural-375, PT-76, and T-34-85 tank.

FAPLA fought UNITA and the South African Defence Force constantly from the 1970s, part of the Angolan Civil War and the South African Border War, including during their 1975-76 invasion, Operation Savannah, and Operation Sceptic (1980), with the Battle of Cuito Cuanavale (1987-1988) being the largest land battle in Africa since the Second World War.

In January 1985, the CIA Directorate of Intelligence estimated that ".. in spite of intensive Soviet training and infusions of Soviet equipment, we believe the Angolan Army is still only a marginally capable fighting force and could not survive against any military threat--internal or external -- without Soviet backing and a Cuban military presence."

The Federal government of the United States said in 1988 that 'FAPLA's military performance was difficult to gauge,' particularly due to opposing propaganda from the different warring parties. On the one hand, UNITA had extended its range of operations from the remote south-eastern extremities throughout the entire country within a few years of Portugal's withdrawal. The SADF had occupied parts of southern Angola for extended periods, virtually without contest, for the purposes of resupplying UNITA, intervening on its behalf, conducting reconnaissance flights and patrols, and attacking South-West Africa People's Organisation encampments. UNITA reported low morale among captured FAPLA conscripts, lack of discipline among troops, heavy losses of personnel and equipment in battle, countless ambushes and attacks on FAPLA forces, successful sabotage operations, and desertions by battalion-size FAPLA units. In the late 1980s, Angola's minister of defence publicly called for greater discipline in FAPLA, citing reports of theft, assaults, and drunken military drivers. As late as 1988, in the wake of reports of increased Angolan Air Force effectiveness, the South African Air Force commander dismissed the Angolans as "extremely unprofessional," noting that "50 percent of the threat against us is Cuban."

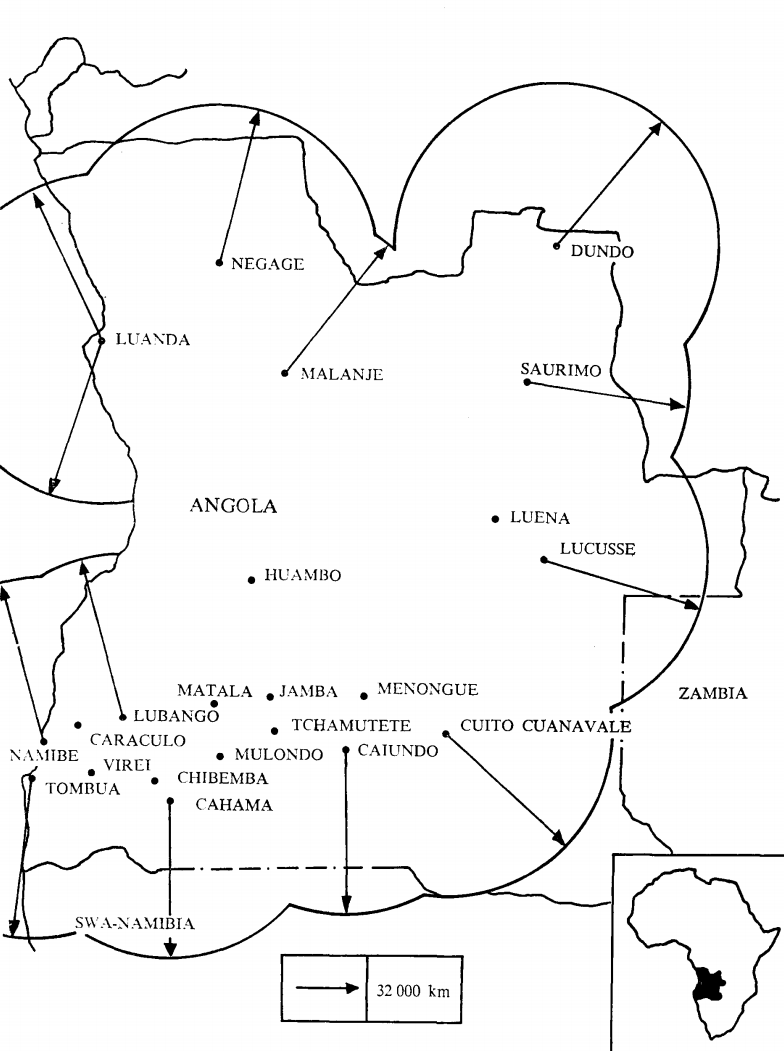
FAPLA's air defence network in 1987.

On the other hand, it could be argued that FAPLA had substantially improved its capabilities and performance. In the first place, FAPLA had begun to develop and acquire the organisation, doctrine, and equipment of a conventional army only during the civil war of 1975-76. It was then forced to fight a counterinsurgency war in the most remote and inaccessible parts of the country over extended lines of communications, without the requisite air or ground transport or logistical infrastructure. UNITA also enjoyed the advantages of operating in thinly populated areas along porous borders with Zambia and Zaire, with extensive SADF combat and logistic support, making it impossible for FAPLA to isolate or outflank UNITA. Moreover, military experts believe that counterinsurgency troops must outnumber guerrillas by ten to one in order to win such wars, a ratio FAPLA could never approximate. The air force and navy were even further behind and had required years to acquire the assets and expertise needed for effective operations. Although the navy was of marginal use in the war, air power was critical.

It was only after sufficient aircraft and air defence systems had been deployed in the mid-1980s that Luanda was able to launch and sustain large offensives in the south. In August 1986, FAPLA repelled UNITA after they had captured Cuito Cuanavale during Operation Alpha Centauri. Although they suffered heavy losses and perhaps relied too heavily on Soviet military doctrine, the FAPLA and the Angolan Air Force (FAPA/DAA) in the late 1980s showed increased strength, put greater pressure on UNITA, and raised the costs of South Africa's support for UNITA. Luanda's resolve and the improved capabilities and performance of its armed forces were among the essential conditions under which South Africa agreed to negotiate its withdrawal from Angola.

Howe writes that Angola's defence minister acknowledged that senior officials profited significantly from weapons purchases; a newspaper sympathetic to the MPLA, Angolense reported that senior officers made US$320 million in commissions.

The Bicesse Accords of May 1991 called for the integration of the FAPLA and UNITA forces, into a 50,000-strong unified, neutral military force.. before the September 1992 election. The FAA was to contain an equal number of FAPLA and FALA personnel.

The FAPLA and UNITA armies began the integration process, but it was halted, as UNITA returned to war following their loss of the 1992 Angolan general election. The army was renamed the Angolan Armed Forces (Portuguese: Forças Armadas Angolanas (FAA)), losing the close nominal association with the MPLA.

== Structure and military regions, 1988 ==
In 1988, the strength of the Angolan armed forces was estimated at 100,000 active-duty and 50,000 reserve personnel, organized into a regular army and a supporting militia, air and air defense force, and navy. The active-duty forces had expanded greatly since independence in the face of SADF and UNITA pressure. The regular army's 91,500 troops were organized into brigades ranging in size from 750 to 1,200 men each, deployed throughout the ten military regions. Most regions were commanded by lieutenant colonels, with majors as deputy commanders, but some regions were commanded by majors. Each region consisted of one to four provinces, with one or more infantry brigades assigned to it. The brigades were generally dispersed in battalion or smaller subunits to protect strategic terrain, urban centers, settlements, and critical infrastructure such as bridges and factories. Counterintelligence agents were assigned to all field units to thwart UNITA infiltration.

External image
- Angolan military regions

Five military regions were initially established in 1975. Their numbers grew to seven in 1983 and ten by December 1985. The First Military Region comprised the Zaire and Uíge Provinces, while the Second comprised the Cabinda enclave. The Fifth and Sixth Military Regions faced Namibia in the south. In early 1988, however, calling this structure inadequate, the Ministry of Defence announced the formation of northern, eastern, southern, and central fronts. The northern front encompassed Zaire, Uíge, Malanje, Cuanza Norte, and Bengo provinces. The eastern front covered Luanda Norte, Lunda Sul, and Moxico Provinces. No official information on the other fronts was available in late 1988, but presumably the southern front included Cuando Cubango, Huíla, and Namibe provinces, and the central front may have comprised Bié, Huambo, Benguela, and Cuanza Sul provinces. There was no information on the status of Cabinda and Luanda provinces, but perhaps they remained separate regions because of their strategic importance and small size. Because of the uncertain boundaries of these fronts, most news accounts referred to the military regions when describing FAPLA's operational areas.
