= Military ranks of Angola =

The military ranks of Angola are the military insignia used by the Angolan Armed Forces.

== Commissioned officer ranks ==
The rank insignia of commissioned officers.

Rank group	General / flag officers				Senior officers			Junior officers
Angolan Army
Angolan Army	General de exército	General	Tenente-general	Brigadeiro	Coronel	Tenente-coronel	Mayor	Capitão	Tenente	Sub-tenente
Angolan Navy
Angolan Navy	Almirante-da-Armada	Almirante	Vice-almirante	Contra-almirante	Capitão-de-mar-e-guerra	Capitão-de-fragata	Capitão-de-corveta	Tenente-de-navio	Tenente-de-fragata	Tenente-de-corveta
National Air Force of Angola
National Air Force of Angola	General-de-Aviação	General	Tenente-general	Brigadeiro	Coronel	Tenente-coronel	Major	Capitão	Tenente	Sub-tenente
Rank group	General / flag officers				Senior officers			Junior officers

=== Student officer ranks ===
Rank group	Student officer
Angolan Army
Angolan Army	Aspirante
Angolan Navy
Angolan Navy	Guarda-marinha
National Air Force of Angola
National Air Force of Angola	Aspirante

== Other ranks ==
The rank insignia of non-commissioned officers and enlisted personnel.

Rank group	Senior NCOs					Junior NCOs	Enlisted
Angolan Army									No insignia
Angolan Army	Sargento-mor	Sargento-chefe	Sargento-ajudante	Primeiro-sargento	Segundo-sargento	Sub-sargento	Primeiro-cabo	Segundo-cabo	Soldado
Angolan Navy									No insignia
Angolan Navy	Sargento-mor	Sargento-chefe	Sargento-ajudante	Primeiro-sargento	Segundo-sargento	Sub-sargento	Cabo	Marinheiro	Grumete
National Air Force of Angola									No insignia
National Air Force of Angola	Sargento-mor	Sargento-chefe	Sargento-ajudante	Primeiro-sargento	Segundo-sargento	Sub-sargento	Primeiro-cabo	Segundo-cabo	Soldado
Rank group	Senior NCOs					Junior NCOs	Enlisted

== Historical rank insignia (1975–1992) ==
=== Commissioned officer ranks ===
Rank group	General / flag officers				Senior officers			Junior officers
People's Army for the Liberation of Angola
People's Army for the Liberation of Angola	General de exército	Coronel general	Tenente-general	Mayor-general	Coronel	Tenente-coronel	Mayor	Capitão	1º tenente	2º tenente

=== Other ranks ===
The rank insignia of non-commissioned officers and enlisted personnel.

Rank group	NCOs			Enlisted
People's Army for the Liberation of Angola				No insignia
People's Army for the Liberation of Angola	1º sargento	2º sargento	3º sargento	Soldado
