= Iko Carreira =

Angolan politician (1933–2000)

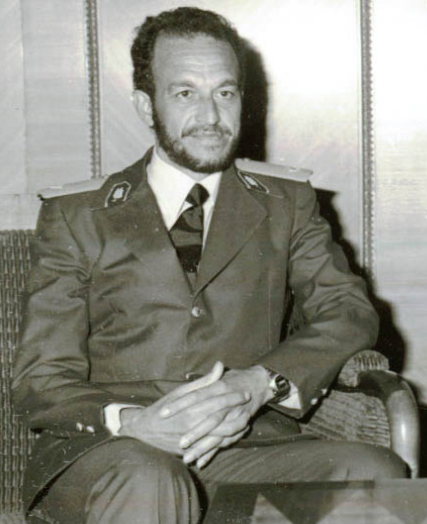
- Iko Carreira

Minister of Defence of Angola
- In office 1975–1979
- Preceded by: Position established
- Succeeded by: Pedro Tonho Pedale

Ambassador of Angola to Algeria
- In office 1987–1989
- Preceded by: João Saraiva de Carvalho
- Succeeded by: José Augusto Kiluanje

Personal details
- Born: June 2, 1933 Quipungo, Portuguese Angola
- Died: May 30, 2000 (aged 66) Madrid, Spain

Military service
- Allegiance: People's Republic of Angola
- Branch/service: People's Armed Forces of Liberation of Angola
- Years of service: 1964–1980
- Rank: General
- Battles/wars: Angolan War of Independence; Angolan Civil War; Battle of Quifangondo

General Henrique Alberto Quádrios Teles Carreira (June 2, 1933 – May 30, 2000), better known by his nickname as Iko Carreira, was an Angolan military officer and diplomat who served as the first Defense Minister of Angola from 1975 to 1980 during the civil war. After the death of Angola's first president, Agostinho Neto, his position in the MPLA weakened. He later served as ambassador to Algeria and military attaché to Spain.

He was born to civil servants in Angola. He joined the Independence Movement in 1957 and went underground in 1964, moving to Zambia and Algeria to receive military training. He was an officer in the People's Movement for the Liberation of Angola (MPLA), Agostinho Neto's armed wing fighting against Portuguese colonial apartheid like rule. Founder and commander in chief of the Angolan Armed Forces, he defeated the FNLA in the north and UNITA in the south during the first phase of the civil war. Considered to be the regime's second in command until Neto's death, he was the first African military officer to receive a degree as a general from a Soviet military academy.

Carreira's last struggle was to combat his illness, a stroke that paralysed his entire left side for the last 13 years of his life, writing two novels with one finger, on a special computer. The novels are titled: O Pensamento Estrategico de Agostinho Neto (Publicacoes Dom Quixote), and Memorias (published in Angola by Nzila). In June 2000, The Guardian's Victoria Brittain wrote in an obituary : "Like his friend and mentor, President Neto, Carreira will always remain a reference point for Angolans for the heroic period of their history."
