= Angolan Armed Forces =

Military of Angola

- Forças Armadas Angolanas
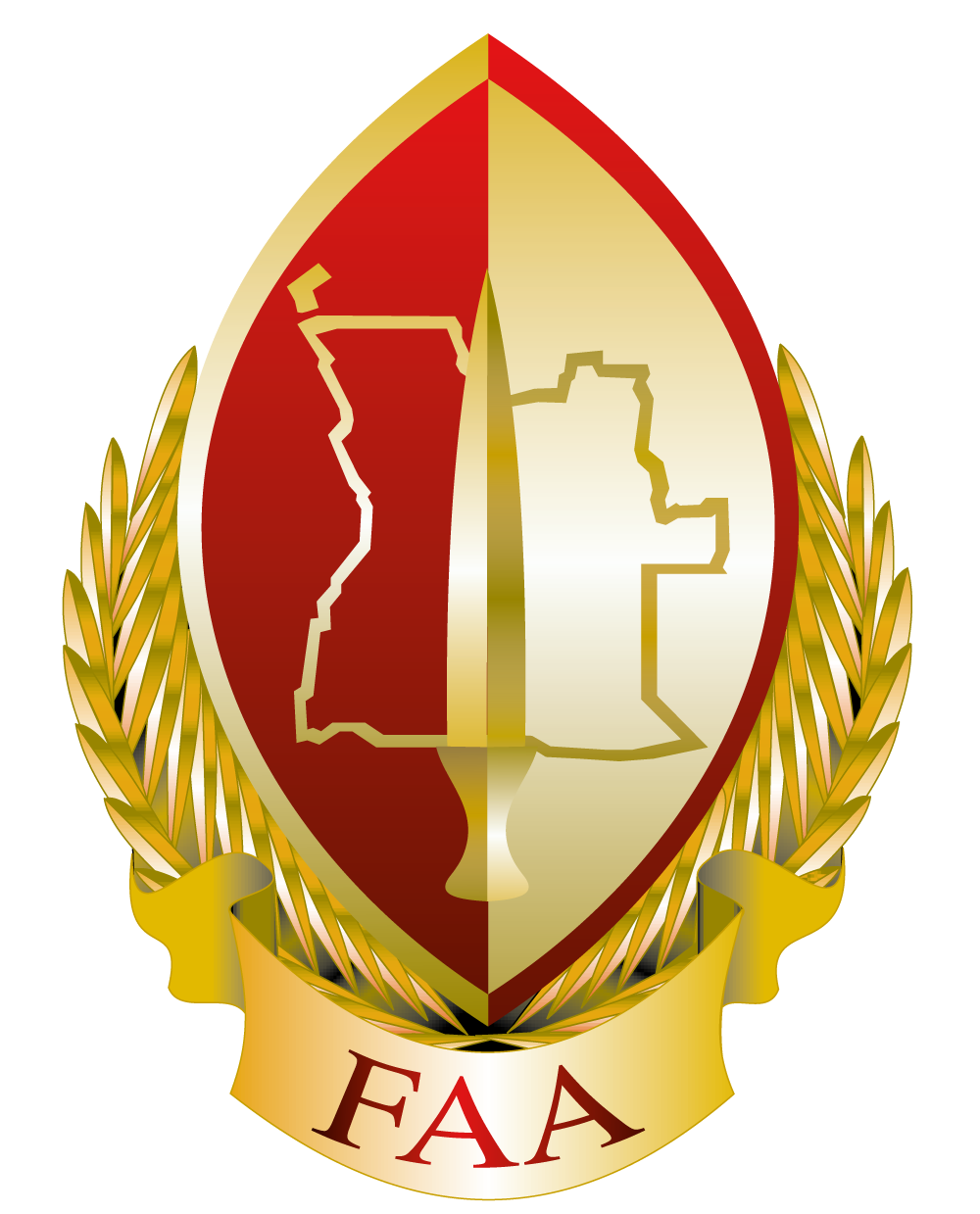
- Founded: 9 October 1991; 35 years ago
- Current form: 1993
- Service branches: Angolan Army; Angolan Navy; National Air Force of Angola; Presidential Guard Unit
- Headquarters: Ministry of National Defence, Rua 17 de Setembro, Luanda, Angola
- Website: faa.ao

Leadership
- Commander-in-Chief: President João Lourenço
- Minister of National Defence and Homeland Veterans: João Ernesto dos Santos
- Chief of General Staff: General António Egídio de Sousa Santos

Personnel
- Conscription: 24 months
- Active personnel: 107,000

Expenditure
- Budget: $1.0B – $1.5B(2025-2026)
- Percent of GDP: ~0.8% to 1.1% (2025 - 2026)

Industry
- Annual imports: Belarus; Brazil; China; Cuba; Czech Republic; Indonesia; European Union; Israel; Moldova; Russia; South Africa; United States

Related articles
- History: Angolan War of Independence; South African Border War; Angolan Civil War; First Congo War; Second Brazzaville-Congolese Civil War; Second Congo War; 2012 Guinea-Bissau coup d'état
- Ranks: Military ranks of Angola

The Angolan Armed Forces (Portuguese: Forças Armadas Angolanas) or FAA is the military of Angola. The FAA consist of the Angolan Army (Exército Angolano), the Angolan Navy (Marinha de Guerra Angolana) and the National Air Force of Angola (Força Aérea Nacional de Angola). Reported total manpower in 2021 was about 107,000. The FAA is headed by the Chief of the General Staff António Egídio de Sousa Santos since 2018, who reports to the minister of National Defense, currently João Ernesto dos Santos.

== History ==
=== Roots ===
The FAA succeeded to the previous People's Armed Forces for the Liberation of Angola (FAPLA) following the abortive Bicesse Accord with the Armed Forces of the Liberation of Angola (FALA), armed wing of the National Union for the Total Independence of Angola (UNITA). As part of the peace agreement, troops from both armies were to be demilitarized and then integrated. Integration was never completed as UNITA and FALA went back to war in 1992. Later, consequences for FALA personnel in Luanda were harsh with FAPLA veterans persecuting their erstwhile opponents in certain areas and reports of vigilantism.

=== Founding ===
The Angolan Armed Forces were created on 9 October 1991. The institutionalization of the FAA was made in the Bicesse Accords, signed in 1991, between the Angolan Government and UNITA. The principles that would govern the FAA were defined in a joint proposal presented on September 24, 1991, and approved on 9 October. On 14 November 1991, Generals João Baptista de Matos and Abílio Kamalata Numa were appointed to the Superior Command of the Armed Forces. The ceremony took place at the Hotel Presidente Luanda, and was presided over by the then-minister França Vandúnem.

== Branches ==
=== Army ===
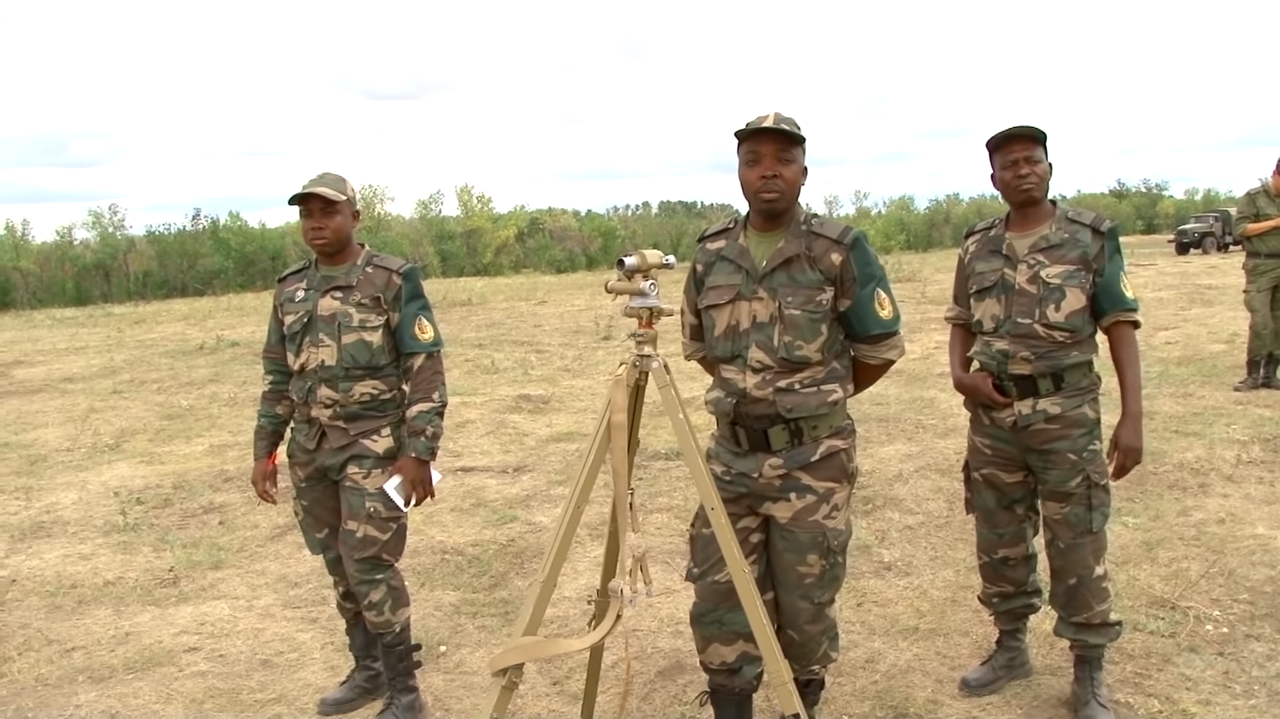
Angolan Second Lieutenant, First Lieutenant, and Captain training in Russia in August 2015

The Army (Exército) is the land component of the FAA. It is organized in six military regions (Cabinda, Luanda, North, Center, East and South), with an infantry division being based in each one. Distributed by the six military regions / infantry divisions, there are 25 motorized infantry brigades, one tank brigade and one engineering brigade. The Army also includes an artillery regiment, the Military Artillery School, the Army Military Academy, an anti-aircraft defense group, a composite land artillery group, a military police regiment, a logistical transportation regiment and a field artillery brigade. The Army further includes the Special Forces Brigade (including Commandos and Special Operations units), but this unit is under the direct command of the General Staff of the FAA.

=== Air Force ===
The National Air Force of Angola (FANA, Força Aérea Nacional de Angola) is the air component of the FAA. It is organized in six aviation regiments, each including several squadrons. To each of the regiments correspond an air base. Besides the aviation regiments, there is also a Pilot Training School.

The Air Force's personnel total about 8,000; its equipment includes transport aircraft and six Russian-manufactured Sukhoi Su-27 fighter aircraft. In 2002, one was lost during the civil war with UNITA forces.

In 1991, the Air Force/Air Defense Forces had 8,000 personnel and 90 combat-capable aircraft, including 22 fighters, 59 fighter ground attack aircraft and 16 attack helicopters.

=== Navy ===
The Angola Navy (MGA, Marinha de Guerra de Angola) is the naval component of the FAA. It is organized in two naval zones (North and South), with naval bases in Luanda, Lobito and Moçâmedes. It includes a Marines Brigade and a Marines School, based in Ambriz. The Navy numbers about 1,000 personnel and operates only a handful of small patrol craft and barges.

The Navy has been neglected and ignored as a military arm mainly due to the guerrilla struggle against the Portuguese and the nature of the civil war. From the early 1990s to the present the Angolan Navy has shrunk from around 4,200 personnel to around 1,000, resulting in the loss of skills and expertise needed to maintain equipment. Portugal has been providing training through its Technical Military Cooperation (CTM) programme. The Navy is requesting procurement of a frigate, three corvettes, three offshore patrol vessel and additional fast patrol boats.

Most of the vessels in the navy's inventory dates back from the 1980s or earlier, and many of its ships are inoperable due to age and lack of maintenance. However the navy acquired new boats from Spain and France in the 1990s. Germany has delivered several Fast Attack Craft for border protection in 2011.

In September 2014 it was reported that the Angolan Navy would acquire seven Macaé-class patrol vessels from Brazil as part of a Technical Memorandum of Understanding (MoU) covering the production of the vessels as part of Angola's Naval Power Development Programme (Pronaval). The military of Angola aims to modernize its naval capability, presumably due to a rise in maritime piracy within the Gulf of Guinea which may have an adverse effect on the country's economy.

The navy's current known inventory includes the following:

- Fast attack craft
  - 4 Mandume class craft (Bazan Cormoran type, refurbished in 2009)
- Patrol boats
  - 3 18.3m long Patrulheiro patrol boats (refurbished in 2002)
  - 5 ARESA PVC-170
  - 2 Namacurra-class harbour patrol boats
- Fisheries Patrol Boats
  - Ngola Kiluange and Nzinga Mbandi (delivered in September and October 2012 from Damen Shipyards)(Operated by Navy personnel under the Ministry of Agriculture, Rural Development and Fisheries)
  - 28-metre FRV 2810 (Pensador) (Operated by Navy personnel under the Ministry of Agriculture, Rural Development and Fisheries)
- Landing craft
  - LDM-400 – 1 or 3 (reportedly has serviceability issues)
- Coastal defense equipment (CRTOC)
  - SS-C1 Sepal radar system

The navy also has several aircraft for maritime patrol:

Aircraft	Origin	Type	Versions	In service	Notes
EMB 111	Brazil	Maritime patrol		6	

== Specialized units ==
=== Special forces ===
The FAA include several types of special forces, namely the Commandos, the Special Operations and the Marines. The Angolan special forces follow the general model of the analogous Portuguese special forces, receiving similar training.

The Commandos and the Special forces are part of the Special Forces Brigade (BRIFE, Brigada de Forças Especiais), based at Cabo Ledo, in the Bengo Province. The BRIFE includes two battalions of commandos, a battalion of special operations and sub-units of combat support and service support. The BRIFE also included the Special Actions Group (GAE, Grupo de Ações Especiais), which is presently inactive and that was dedicated to long range reconnaissance, covert and sabotage operations. In the Cabo Ledo base is also installed the Special Forces Training School (EFFE, Escola de Formação de Forças Especiais). Both the BRIFE and the EFFE are directly under the Directorate of Special Forces of the General Staff of the Armed Forces.

The marines (fuzileiros navais) constitute the Marines Brigade of the Angolan Navy. The Marines Brigade is not permanently dependent of the Directorate of Special Forces, but can detach their units and elements to be put under the command of that body for the conduction of exercises or real operations. The Marines have a special forces unit known as Special Operations Marines(FOE, Fuzileiros Operaçües Especiais).

Since the disbandment of the Angolan Parachute Battalion in 2004, the FAA do not have a specialized paratrooper unit. However, elements of the commandos, special operations and marines are parachute qualified.

=== Territorial troops ===
The Directorate of People's Defense and Territorial Troops of the Defence Ministry or ODP was established in late 1975. It had 600,000 members, having personnel in virtually every village by 1979. It had both armed and unarmed units dispersed in villages throughout the country. The People's Vigilance Brigades (Portuguese: Brigadas Populares de Vigilância, BPV) also serve a similar purpose.

== Training establishments ==
=== Armed Forces Academy ===
The Military Academy (Portuguese: Academia Militar do Exército, AMEx) is a military university public higher education establishment whose mission is to train officers of the Permanent Staff of the Army. It has been in operation since 21 August 2009 by presidential decree. Its headquarters are in Lobito. It trains in the following specialties:

- Infantry
- Tanks
- Land Artillery
- Anti-Air Defense
- Military Engineering
- Logistics
- Telecommunications
- Hidden Direction of Troops
- Military Administration
- Armament and Technique
- Chemical Defense
- Operational Military Intelligence
- Technical Repair and Maintenance Platoon of Auto and Armored Technique

=== Navy ===
- Naval War Institute (INSG)
- Naval Academy
- Naval Specialist School

=== Air Force ===
- Angolan Military Aviation School
- Pilot Basic Training School (Lobito)

== Institutions/other units ==
=== Military Hospitals ===
The Military hospital of the FAA is the Main Military Hospital. It has the following lineage:

- 1961 – Evacuation Infirmary
- 1962 – Military Hospital of Luanda
- 1975 – Military Hospital
- 1976 – Central Military Hospital
- 1989 – Main Military Hospital

It provides specialized medical assistance in accordance with the military health system; It also promotes post-graduate education and scientific research. Currently, the Main Military Hospital serves 39 special medical specialties. It is a headed by a Director General whose main supporting body is the board of directors.

=== Supreme Military Court ===
The Supreme Military Court is the highest organ of the hierarchy of military courts. The Presiding Judge, the Deputy Presiding Judge and the other Counselor Judges of the Supreme Military Court are appointed by the President of the Republic. The composition, organization, powers and functioning of the Supreme Military Court are established by law.

=== Military Bands ===
The FAA maintains Portuguese-style military bands in all three branches and in individual units. The primary band is the 100-member Music Band of the Presidential Security Household. The music band of the Army Command was created on 16 June 1994 and four years later, on 15 August 1998, the National Air Force created a music band within an artistic brigade. The navy has its own marching band, as well as a small musical group known as Banda 10 de Julho (10 July Band), based at the Luanda Naval Base.

== Foreign deployments ==
The FAPLA's main counterinsurgency effort was directed against UNITA in the southeast, and its conventional capabilities were demonstrated principally in the undeclared South African Border War. The FAPLA first performed its external assistance mission with the dispatch of 1,000 to 1,500 troops to São Tomé and Príncipe in 1977 to bolster the socialist regime of President Manuel Pinto da Costa. During the next several years, Angolan forces conducted joint exercises with their counterparts and exchanged technical operational visits. The Angolan expeditionary force was reduced to about 500 in early 1985.

The Angolan Armed Forces were controversially involved in training the armed forces of fellow Lusophone states Cape Verde and Guinea-Bissau. In the case of the latter, the 2012 Guinea-Bissau coup d'état was cited by the coup leaders as due to Angola's involvement in trying to "reform" the military in connivance with the civilian leadership.

Occasionally skirmishes on the DRC-Angola border happening, sometimes also in connection with the Cabinda conflict. In 2020 one Angolan soldier died after a gun battle with congolese forces in Kasai region on DRC territory. A presence during the unrest in Ivory Coast, 2010–2011, were not officially confirmed. However, the Frankfurter Allgemeine Zeitung, citing Jeune Afrique, said that among President Gbagbo's guards were 92 personnel of President Dos Santos's Presidential Guard Unit. Angola is basically interested in the participation of the FAA operations of the African Union and has formed special units for this purpose.

In 2021, the Angolan Parliament approved integration of FAA into Southern African Development Community (SADC)'s mission for peace in Cabo Delgado, Mozambique. Angola sent a team of 20 officers to participate.
