= Zastava M55 =

Yugoslav towed 20 mm anti-aircraft gun

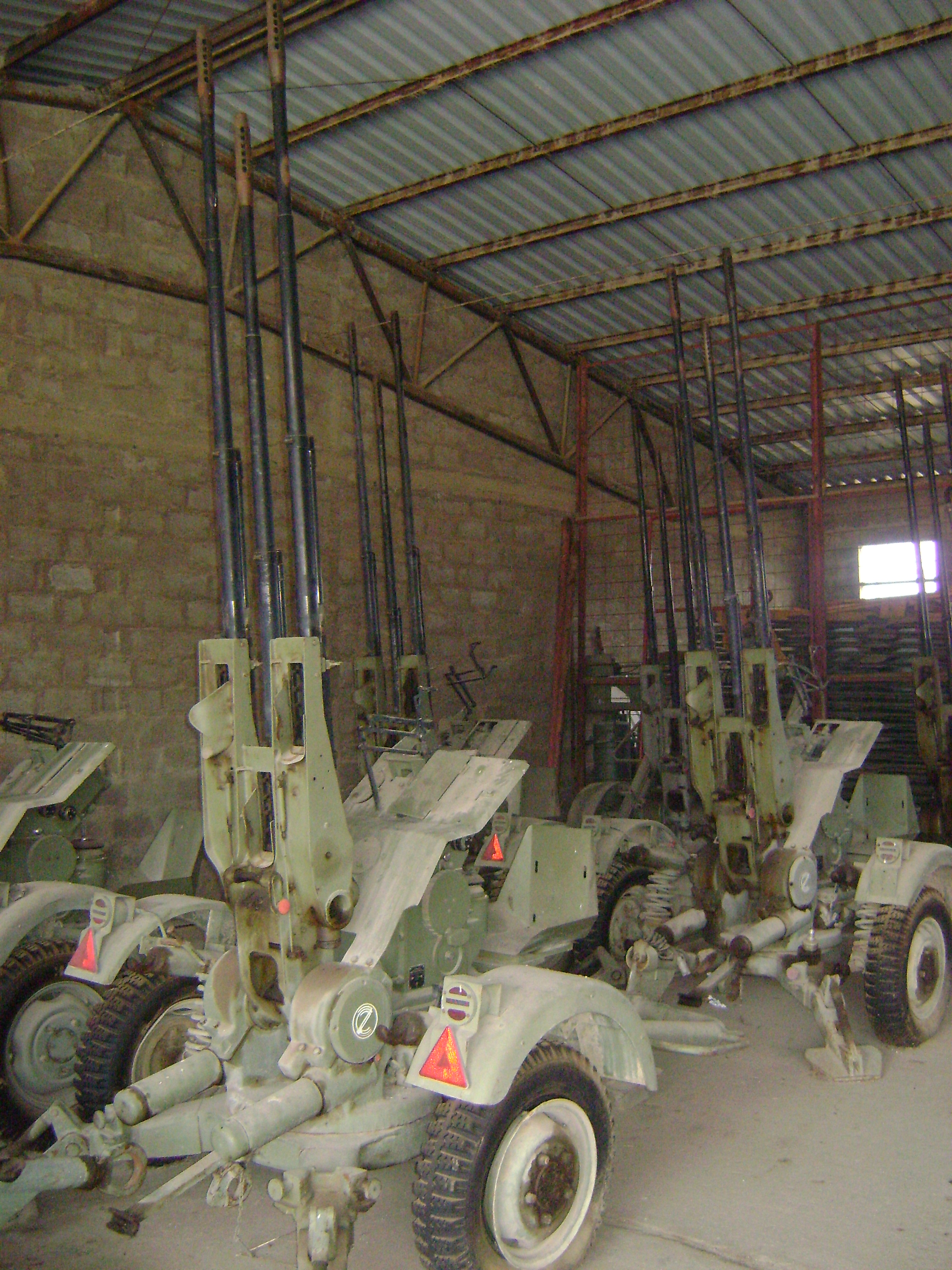
- M55 A4 B1 guns of the former Army of Republika Srpska
- Type: Towed 20 mm triple-barreled anti-aircraft gun
- Place of origin: Yugoslavia/Serbia

Service history
- In service: 1955–present
- Used by: See Operators
- Wars: Yom Kippur War; Angolan Civil War; South African Border War; Rhodesian Bush War; Mozambican Civil War; Lebanese Civil War; Salvadoran Civil War; Yugoslav Wars; Second Nagorno-Karabakh war Russian invasion of Ukraine

Production history
- Designer: Zastava Arms
- Designed: 1955–1971
- Manufacturer: Zastava Arms
- Produced: 1971–present
- Variants: See Variants section

Specifications (Zastava M55)
- Mass: 1,100 kg (2,400 lb) loaded, 970 kg (2,140 lb) unloaded
- Length: 1.47 m (4 ft 10 in) (driving condition)
- Barrel length: 1,956 mm (77.0 in) L/70
- Width: 1.27 m (4 ft 2 in) (driving condition)
- Height: 4.30 m (14.1 ft) (driving condition)
- Crew: 6 (gunners and commander)
- Shell: 20x110mm Hispano
- Caliber: 20 mm
- Barrels: 3
- Action: Gas operated
- Elevation: +83° to -5
- Traverse: 360°
- Rate of fire: 1,950 and 2,250 rpm cyclic, 700 rpm practical
- Muzzle velocity: Armour-piercing: 840 m/s (2,800 ft/s), High-explosive incendiary: 850 m/s (2,800 ft/s)
- Effective firing range: 2,000 m (6,600 ft) (air), 2,500 m (8,200 ft) (ground targets)
- Maximum firing range: 4,000 m (13,000 ft) (vertical), 5,500 m (18,000 ft) (horizontal)
- Feed system: 3 x 60 round top-fed drum magazines

The Zastava M55, also designated 20/3-mm-M55, is a Yugoslavian/Serbian 20mm triple-barreled automatic anti-aircraft gun developed in 1955 and produced by Crvena Zastava (now Zastava Arms company) in Kragujevac, Serbia, for Yugoslav People's Army use and also for the export market. In addition to the basic towed model M55 A2, the variants M55 A3 B1, M55 A4 B1, and the BOV-3 SPAAG were also developed.

== Development ==
In 1951, the Federal Secretariat of People's Defense (Serbo-Croatian: Savezni sekretarijat za narodnu odbranu – SSNO) purchased the manufacturing licence of the single-barrel Hispano-Suiza HS.804 20mm L/70 anti-aircraft autocannon mounted on the HSS.630-3 towed gun carriage. The HS.804 made by the Crvena Zastava Company entered production in 1955 as the Zastava 20/1mm M55 and the company's engineers began working in the development of a triple-barrelled version; the first prototype was completed and entered production in 1971.

== Variants ==
=== Ground model M55 A2 ===
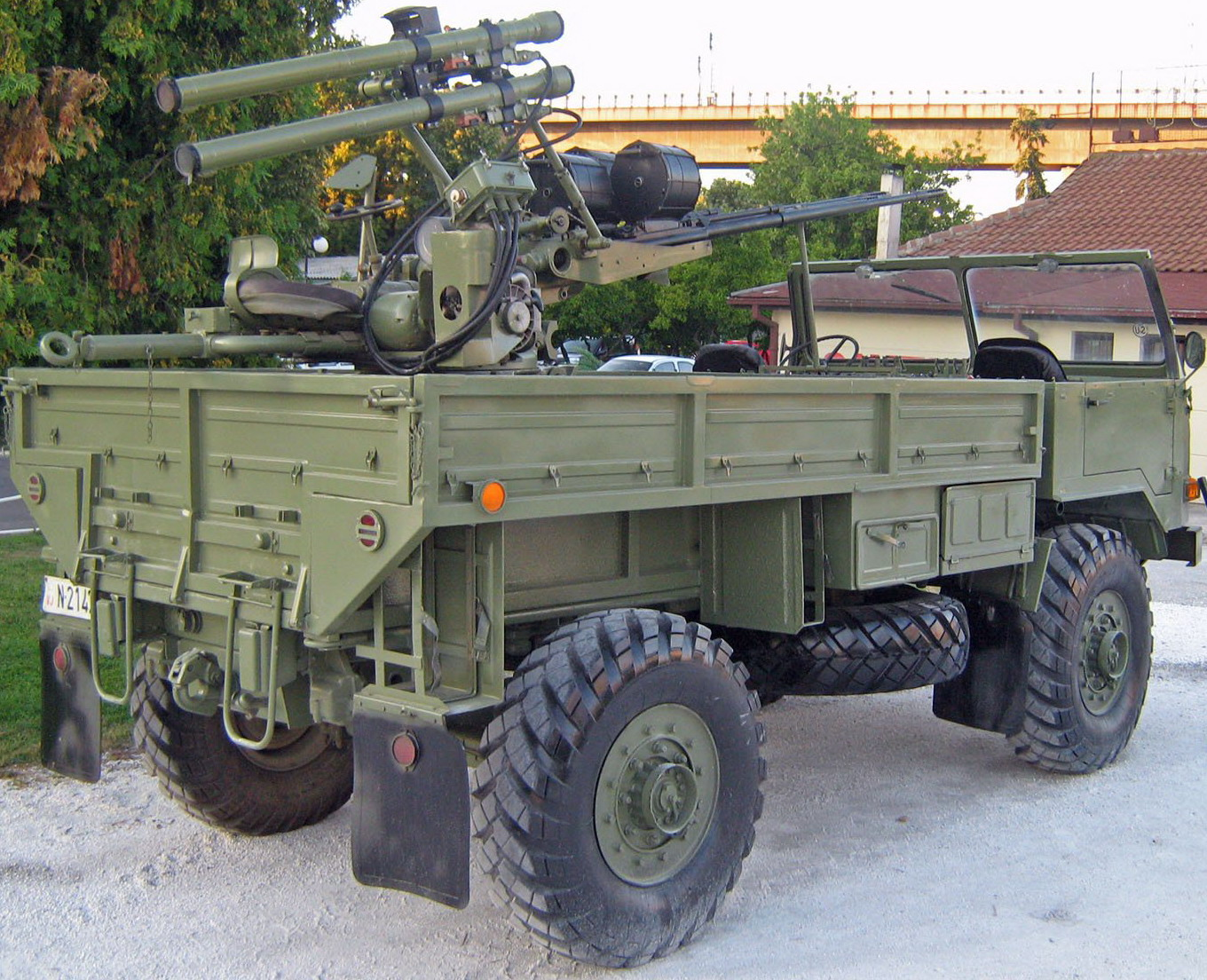
Zastava M55 with a SA-7 surface-to-air missile mount on a TAM-110 military transport truck

The standard towed version of the M55 introduced in 1971, is intended for infantry use.

=== M55 A3 B1 ===
The M55 A3 B1 is an improved version of the M55 A2 introduced in 1978.

=== M55 A4 B1 ===
The M55 A4 B1 was introduced in 1977–78, and is an M55 gun system mounted on the towed carriage of the Swiss GAI-D01 anti-aircraft gun. A new computer-controlled targeting system – the Galileo ballistic computer – was installed, which automatically monitors the gun after the target has been acquired. In addition, an engine of the same type as the M55 A3 B1 has been placed under the gunner's seat, which was moved from the lateral position found on the previous version in order to improve the weight distribution of the three barrels and prevent them from vibrating. When the cannon is put into position, the towed carriage is removed, and a small splinter-proof shield has been installed in front of the targeting device and the gunner.

=== M55 A4 M1 (BOV-3) ===
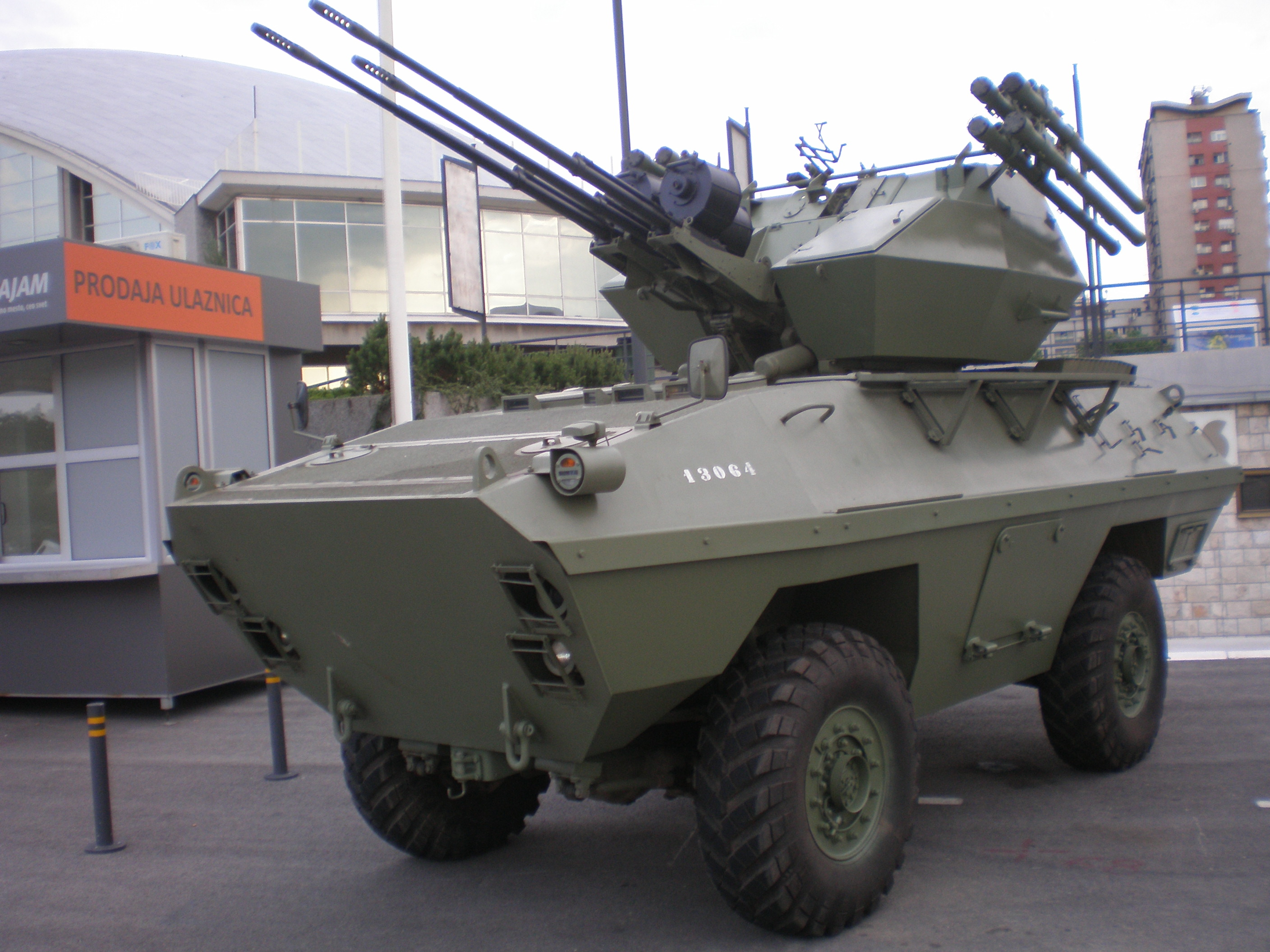
M55 A4 M1 (BOV-3)

The M55 A4 M1 was first introduced in 1983, and consists on a modified A4 B1 system upgraded with the Galileo J171 ballistic computer, mounted on a turret installed in the top roof of a BOV armoured personnel carrier.

== Combat history ==
=== Africa ===
The Zastava M55 A2 was employed extensively by the People's Armed Forces of Liberation of Angola (FAPLA) during the Angolan Civil War (1975–2002) and the later stages of the South African Border War (1966–1990), with a number of them being captured by the South African Defence Force during their military operations launched against SWAPO/PLAN guerrilla bases at southern Angola in the 1980s. Some of the captured guns were stripped from the triple mounts and re-mounted on the Casspir APCs employed by the Koevoet on their counter-insurgency operations in Angola and South West Africa whilst others were handed over to the Armed Forces of Liberation of Angola, the armed wing of UNITA.

The Zastava M55 was also employed by the People's Forces of Liberation of Mozambique (FPLM) during both the Mozambican Civil War (1977–1992) and the later phase of the Rhodesian Bush War, with a few guns falling into the hands of the Rhodesian Security Forces in the course of their covert cross-border raids on Zimbabwe African National Liberation Army (ZANLA) guerrilla training camps in Mozambique during the late 1970s.

=== Middle East ===
Lebanon received an unspecified number of Zastava M55 A2 autocannons sometime in the early 1970s from Yugoslavia, which were assigned to the air defense units of the Lebanese Army and the Lebanese Air Force. They were extensively employed during the Lebanese Civil War (1975–1990), with several guns falling into the hands of the various competing Christian and Muslim militias after the collapse of the Lebanese Armed Forces in January 1976. Main operators included the Army of Free Lebanon, Lebanese Arab Army, Al-Tanzim, Kataeb Regulatory Forces, Zgharta Liberation Army, the Tigers Militia, Arab Socialist Union, the Druze People's Liberation Army, the Al-Mourabitoun, and the Palestine Liberation Organization who mounted their Zastava M55 autocannons on technicals and M113 armored personnel carriers.

=== 2020 Nagorno-Karabakh War ===
Azerbaijan's Ministry of Defence reported that it destroyed two Armenian Zastava M55s on 9–10 October 2020 as part of the 2020 Nagorno-Karabakh war.

=== Russian invasion of Ukraine ===
Zastava M55 anti-aircraft guns, likely donated by Slovenia or Croatia, have been used by the Armed Forces of Ukraine to shoot down Russian drones during the Russian invasion of Ukraine.

== Operators ==
=== Current operators ===
- Armenia
- Azerbaijan – Captured from Armenia in the Second Nagorno-Karabakh War.
- Democratic Republic of the Congo
- Croatia − 6 BOV-3 as of 2023.
- Cyprus − 36 as of 2023.
- El Salvador − 31 as of 2023.
- Guatemala − 16 as of 2023.
- Honduras − 24 M55 A2 as of 2023.
- Indonesia
- Tonga − adapted for use on patrol vessels (2 x triple barrel / 6 barrels)
- Mozambique
- Serbia – mounted on BOV M16 Miloš and Lazar 3.
- Tunisia − 100 as of 2023.
- Ukraine
- Zambia
- North Macedonia

=== Former operators ===
- Angola
- Armed Forces of Liberation of Angola (UNITA) – Handed over by South Africa or captured from FAPLA.
- Artsakh − Seized by Azerbaijan after the 2023 Azerbaijani offensive in Nagorno-Karabakh.
- Bosnia and Herzegovina
- Lebanon
- Palestine Liberation Organization (PLO) – Captured from the Lebanese Armed Forces.
- Rhodesia – Captured from FPLM or ZANLA.
- Serbia and Montenegro
- Slovenia
- United Arab Emirates
- Yugoslavia − Passed on to successor states.
- Zimbabwe

== See also ==
- Hispano-Suiza HS.404
- Hispano-Suiza HS.820
- Oerlikon 20 mm cannon
- Zastava Arms
- ZPU
- ZU-23-2

== Bibliography ==
- Cullen, Tony; Foss, Christopher F., eds. (1992). Jane's Land-based Air Defence 1992-93 (PDF) (5th ed.). Jane's Information Group. ISBN 978-0-7106-0979-3. Archived from the original (PDF) on 27 July 2023.
- Cullen, Tony; Foss, Christopher F., eds. (2001). Jane's Land-Based Air Defense 2001-2002 (14th ed.). Janes Information Group. ISBN 978-0-7106-2320-1.
- Helmoed-Romer Heitman & Paul Hannon, Modern African Wars (3): South-West Africa, Men-at-arms series 242, Osprey Publishing Ltd, London 1991. ISBN 978-1-85532-122-9
- International Institute for Strategic Studies (1989). The military balance, 1989-1990. London: Brassey's. ISBN 978-0080375694.
- International Institute for Strategic Studies (2023). The Military Balance 2023 (1st ed.). Routledge. ISBN 978-1032508955.
- Kassis, Samer (2003). 30 Years of Military Vehicles in Lebanon. Beirut: Elite Group. ISBN 9953-0-0705-5.
- Kassis, Samer (2012). Véhicules Militaires au Liban 1975-1981 [Military Vehicles in Lebanon 1975-1981]. Chyah: Trebia Publishing. ISBN 978-9953-0-2372-4.
- Kassis, Samer (2019). Invasion of Lebanon 1982. Abteilung 502. ISBN 978-84-120935-1-3.
- Paul Jureidini, R. D. McLaurin, and James Price, Military operations in selected Lebanese built-up areas, 1975-1978, Aberdeen, MD: U.S. Army Human Engineering Laboratory, Aberdeen Proving Ground, Technical Memorandum 11–79, June 1979.
- Sex, Zachary; Abi-Chahine, Bassel (2021). Modern Conflicts 2 – The Lebanese Civil War, From 1975 to 1991 and Beyond. Modern Conflicts Profile Guide. Vol. II. AK Interactive. EAN 8435568306073.
- Tom Cooper & Sergio Santana, Lebanese Civil War Volume 1: Palestinian diaspora, Syrian and Israeli interventions, 1970-1978, Middle East@War No. 21, Helion & Company Limited, Solihull UK 2019. ISBN 978-1-915070-21-0
- Venter, Al J. (1992). War in Angola. Hong Kong: Concord Publications. ISBN 962-361-030-0.
