= Aresa PVC-170 =

Angolan Navy patrol boat class

PVC-170

Class overview
- Builders: Grup Aresa Internacional Shipyards
- Operators: Angolan Navy
- Completed: 5
- Active: 5

General characteristics
- Type: Patrol Boat
- Displacement: 18 t (full)
- Length: 16 m
- Beam: 4.48 m
- Draft: 2.3 m
- Propulsion: 2 diesels; 1,650 hp; 2 shafts
- Speed: 35 kt
- Range: 420 n miles at 20 kt
- Complement: 5

The PVC-170 is a patrol boat class built for the Angolan Navy by Aresa (Barcelona, Spain) in 2009 for Angolan fishery protection duties under Spanish Fisheries Department aid programme.
