= FALA =

Armed Forces of Liberation of Angola Forças Armadas de Libertação de Angola
- Active: 1965–2002
- Country: Angola
- Allegiance: UNITA
- Type: Guerrilla and later semi-regular army
- Role: Armed Wing of UNITA
- Engagements: Angolan War of Independence; Angolan Civil War

Commanders
- Notable commanders: Jonas Savimbi

Insignia
- Abbreviation: FALA

The Armed Forces of the Liberation of Angola (Portuguese: Forças Armadas de Libertação de Angola) or FALA was the armed wing of the National Union for the Total Independence of Angola (UNITA), a prominent political faction during the Angolan Civil War.

== History ==
After their training in China in 1965, the first military cadres returned to Angola, settled in the eastern part of the country and began the mobilization and recruitment of guerrillas. In this way, the first embryonic contingent of FALA was formed.

The number of guerrillas increased with the growing number of UNITA members among the population, thus permitting effective military training. This enabled them to begin the mission of liberating the country from Portuguese colonialism, as proved by the attacks of 4 and 25 December 1966 on Kassamba and Teixeira de Sousa respectively. The first military regions were established along with their respective independent zones and operational fronts like Quembo, Lewa and the northern zone.

The Second Congress of UNITA was held in 1969, when a programme for FALA was laid down. This included the expansion of the guerrilla war to the central, southern and northern parts of the country and the formation of compact guerrilla contingents for all fronts, zones and military regions existing at the time. The Black Panther contingent was then formed, under the command of Major Samuimbila. The first Chief of Staff, Samuel Piedoso Chingunji, better known by his war name, Kapessi Kafundanga, was also appointed.

FALA became very effective, causing the enemy to suffer many defeats, expanding the guerrilla zones and consolidating the liberated areas—a force that the Portuguese colonialists could not ignore. On 14 June 1974, a ceasefire was signed with the Portuguese government.

There being little possibility of a peaceful solution to the Angolan problem, UNITA played a role as a moderator in order to avoid an armed confrontation, triggered on the one hand by the Soviet Union in support of the MPLA and on the other hand by the United States of America, supporting the National Liberation Front of Angola (FNLA).

The People's Movement for the Liberation of Angola (MPLA), through the Cubans, violated the Alvor agreement, opting for the seizure of power through the use of arms.

During the civil war, FALA abandoned the towns not only to reorganize itself, but also to oppose the minority regime of Luanda through guerrilla warfare. In May 1976, owing to the turmoil, the Conference of Cuanza was held, resulting in the Cuanza Manifesto. The latter laid down a programme for FALA for the remobilization of the soldiers and cadres, which at that stage were traumatized by the aggressive Soviet war machine.

Territorial organization of the army that included fronts and independent military regions now took place. The first politico-military cadres––among them that of Major Jose´ Jeremias Bandua who died in Cunene––were trained.

Compact guerrilla units were formed: Venceremos, Estamos a Voltar (MR1), Dragões da morte (MR3) and Faísca negra (MR85).

By 1977, people were joining UNITA in large numbers and, consequently, the number of guerrillas increased considerably.

In March of the same year, at Benda in the Huambo Province, the movement's Fourth Congress was held and outlined further objectives for FALA, such as the formation of the first trained, equipped and motivated battalions, among which the battalions of Sam Nujomo and Kazambuela stood out.

The disciplinary code of the FALA was also established. The military regions were restructured and the guerrilla regions expanded. Training camps were established in the same year on all fronts as well as in the politico-military cadres in Military Region 11. Territorial divisions were also designated, thus forming northern, eastern and western fronts.

In 1979, the first semi-regular battalions were formed, such as Samuimbila, Siule Siule and 333.

In 1980, the expansion of semi-regular battalions gave new vigour to the armed struggle, leading to capturing new territories and the consolidation of those that had already been conquered. More specialists in anti-aircraft artillery, engineering, intelligence, special commandos, communications, logistics and medical care were trained. In 1981 the first brigades such as the 12th, 21st, 53rd, 34th and 45th were formed and other battalions were maintained as independent units.

In 1982 the Fifth Congress was held, which drew up a new strategy for FALA, including the formation of military columns and compact guerrilla units at the level of all politico-military fronts.

== Weaponry and Equipment ==
	Origin	Type	Notes
Panhard AML	France	Armoured Scout Car	4 obtained from Zaire
T-34	Soviet Union	Tank	Captured from Angolan Government Forces. UNITA disclosed its own T-34-85 fleet in 1985.
BTR-152	Soviet Union	Armored Personnel Carrier	Captured from Angolan Government Forces
BMP-2	Soviet Union	Infantry Fighting Vehicle	Captured from Angolan Army
BGM-71 TOW	United States	Anti-tank missile	Delivered from United States in 1987
FIM-92 Stinger	United States	MANPADS	10 Launchers and 300 missiles delivered in 1986
9K32 Strela-2	Soviet Union	MANPADS	About 50 Launchers obtained
MILAN	France	Anti-tank missile	Unknown amount of launchers and 150 missiles delivered
RPG-7	Soviet Union	Rocket-propelled grenade	
M72 LAW	United States	Rocket-propelled grenade	
GP-25	Soviet Union	Grenade Launcher	
Zastava M55	Yugoslavia	Anti-Air Autocannon	Captured from FAPLA
PPSh-41	Soviet Union	Submachine gun	Captured from Angolan Government forces
AK-47	Soviet Union	Assault Rifle	Some captured from FAPLA
AKM	Soviet Union	Assault Rifle	
Type 56 assault rifle	China	Assault Rifle	
Heckler & Koch G3	West Germany	Battle Rifle	
FN FAL	Belgium	Battle Rifle	
SKS	Soviet Union	Battle Rifle	

== See also ==
- Angolan Armed Forces
- People's Armed Forces for the Liberation of Angola
