= Presidential Guard Unit (Angola) =

The Presidential Guard Unit (Portuguese: Unidade da Guarda Presidencial; UGP) is the Angolan Armed Forces presidential guard to the President of Angola. It is also responsible for the defense of the capital of Luanda. The special unit specializes in house warfare. The group consists of both male and female members whose mission is to ensure and protect the physical integrity of the President. It is therefore part of the Central Protection and Security Unit (DCPS) in the Military Bureau of the Angolan Presidency. The unit's commander is Lieutenant General Alfredo Tyaunda.

== History ==
The UPG participated in Angolan Civil War. On 26 November 2003, soldiers from the UGP kidnapped car washer Arsénio "Cherokee" Sebastião and threw him into the sea off the Mussulo peninsula where he would later drown. The reason for this was because of his singing of an anti-José Eduardo dos Santos rap, with his drowning in front of witnesses being seen as a type of lesson to others with similar sentiments. A beer vendor at the scene described the guards reasoning, recalling that the guards said that "the youth was a bandit, who spoke ill of the president and thus had to be killed." The incident changed the local citizen's relationship with the UGP, with local media groups dubbing the guard as the Fedayeen a reference to the military groups willing to sacrifice themselves in service to Iraqi President Saddam Hussein.

According to the newspaper Jeune Afrique, in the course of the 2010–2011 Ivorian crisis, 92 soldiers from the UPG were sent to protect President Laurent Gbagbo in the presidential residence in Abidjan and repel the Republican Forces of Côte d'Ivoire fought. They are said to have mined the building. The reports were rejected by the Angolan government. In September 2012, 15 UGP soldiers were put on trial for insubordination after being accused of making "demands in a group" in relations to their calls for better wages and working conditions. In 2015, it was announced that the UGP would undergoe a process in which its rapid response capabilities would be strengthened. In 2018, President João Lourenço ordered the stationing of 5,000 UGP soldiers in the province of Cuando Cubango.

== See also ==
- Ivorian Republican Guard
- Republican Guard (Democratic Republic of the Congo)
- Presidential Guard (Zimbabwe)
