= Chief of General Staff (Angola) =

Chief of the General Staff of the Angolan Armed Forces
- Chefe do Estado Maior-General das Forças Armadas Angolanas (Portuguese)
- Incumbent; Altino Carlos José dos Santos since 20 January 2023
- Angolan Armed Forces
- Abbreviation: CEMGFAA
- Reports to: Minister of National Defence
- Appointer: President
- Formation: 1975
- Website: Official website

The Chief of General Staff (Portuguese: Chefe do Estado Maior-General das Forças Armadas Angolanas; CEMGFAA) of the Angolan Armed Forces is the highest-ranking military officer in the Angolan military and is responsible for maintaining control over the three service branches of the military.

== List of chiefs ==
=== People's Armed Forces of Liberation of Angola (1975–1992) ===
No.	Name (birth–death)	Term of office			Ref.
No.	Name (birth–death)	Took office	Left office	Time in office	Ref.
?	Lieutenant general António França (born 1938)	1982	1988	5–6 years	

=== Angolan Armed Forces (1992–present) ===
No.	Portrait	Name (birth–death)	Term of office			Ref.
No.	Portrait	Name (birth–death)	Took office	Left office	Time in office	Ref.
1		Army general João de Matos (1955–2017)	1992	2001	8–9 years	
2		Army general Armando da Cruz Neto	2001	2003	1–2 years	
3		Army general Agostinho Fernandes Nelumb	2003	2006	2–3 years	
4		Army general Francisco Pereira Furtado (born 1958)	2006	2010	3–4 years	
5		Army general Geraldo Nunda (born 1952)	6 October 2010	23 April 2018	7 years, 199 days	
6		Army general António Egídio de Sousa Santos	23 April 2018	20 January 2023	4 years, 272 days	
7		Air general Altino Carlos José dos Santos (born 1957)	20 January 2023	Incumbent	3 years, 230 days	
