= Geraldo Nunda =

Diplomat and former general from Angola

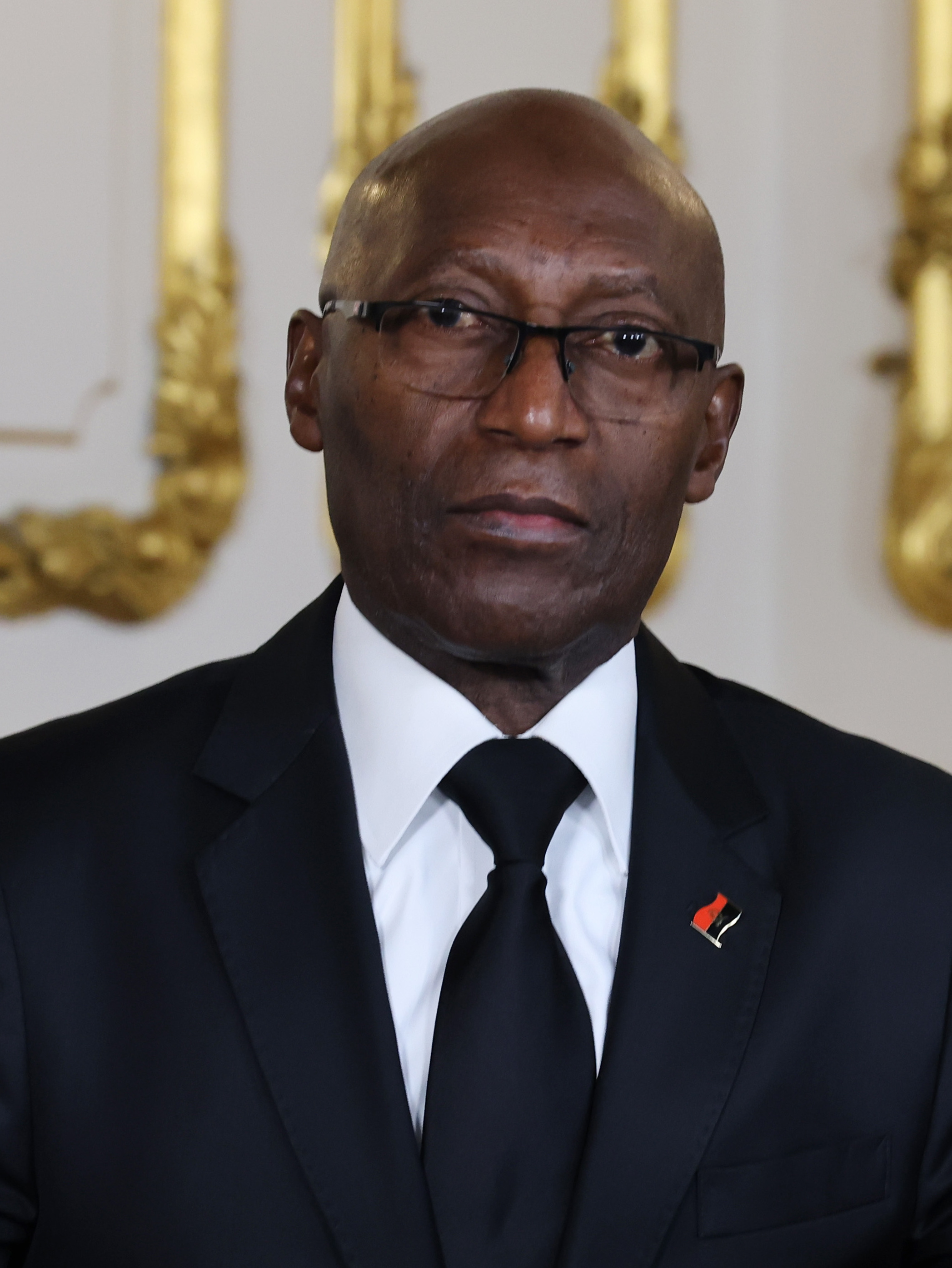
Nunda in 2022

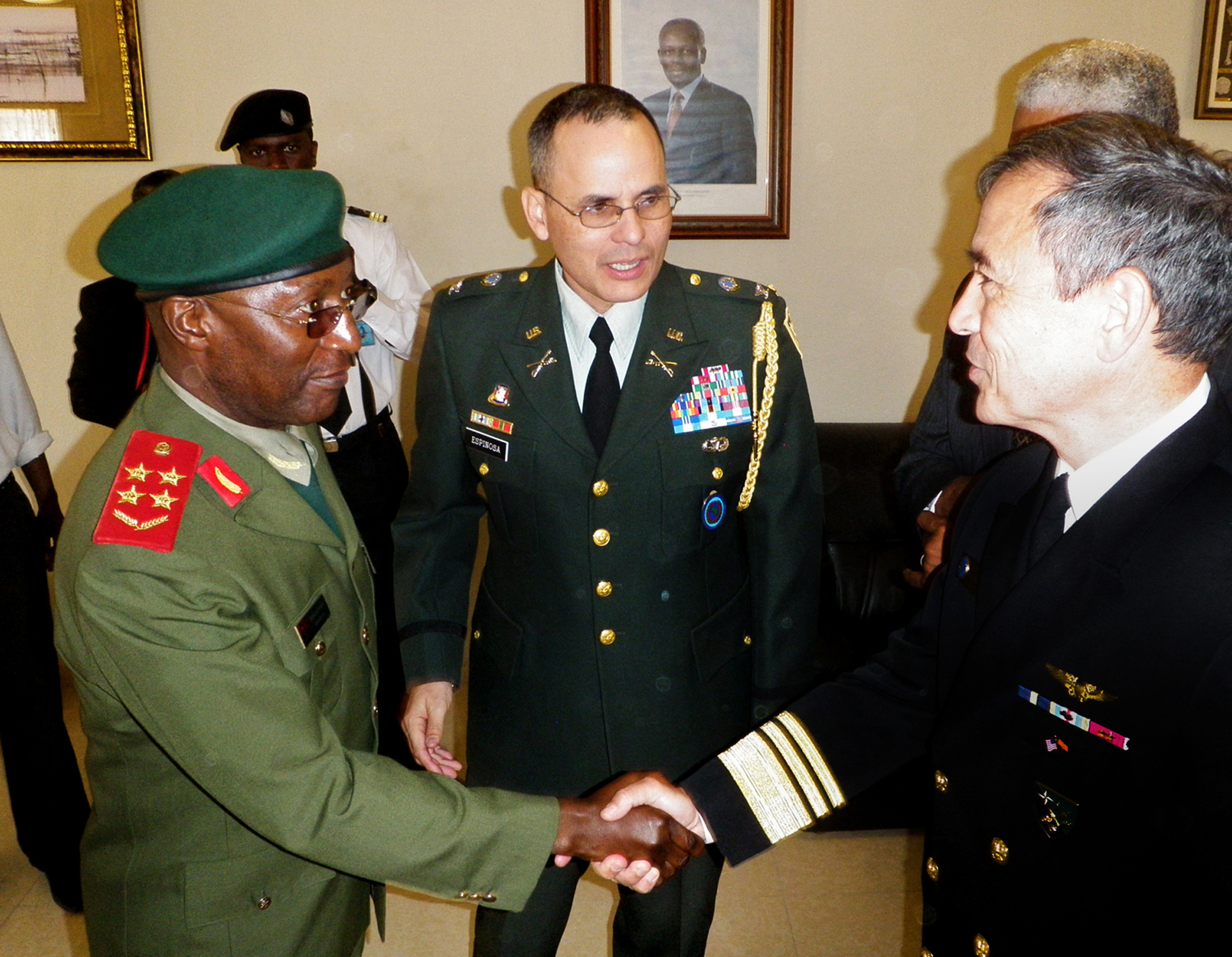
Nunda meeting Vice Adm. Harry Harris, 2011

Geraldo Sachipengo Nunda is a diplomat and former general. He is currently ambassador of the Republic of Angola to the United Kingdom of Great Britain and Northern Ireland (since 15 January 2020).

== Biography ==
He was born on 13 September 1952 in Nharaa, Bié. In 2002, he "graduated in Social Sciences of Education" and in 2009 gained a master's degree in the history of Angola from the Agostinho Neto University. Nunda was head of the Angolan Armed forces from 2010 until 2018, when he was charged over reports of corruption. These were later dropped due to an absence of evidence.
