= Hotel Presidente Luanda =

Hotel in Luanda, Angola

Coordinates: 8.803407468365899°S 13.242016191846501°E

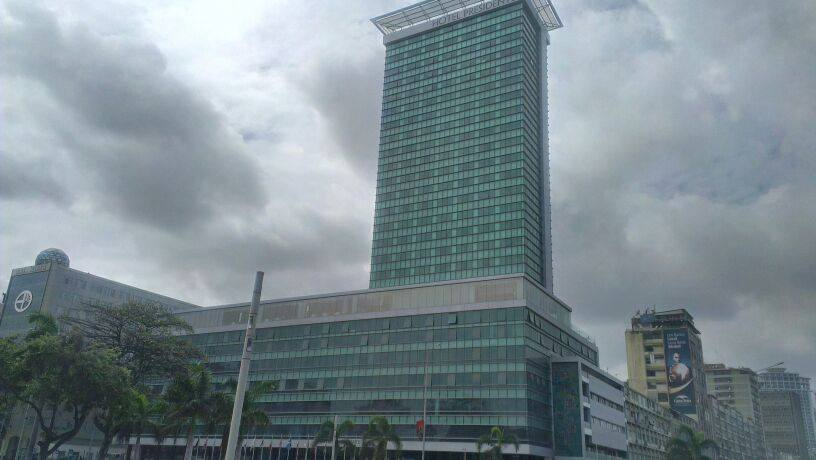
Hotel Presidente Luanda

Hotel Presidente Luanda or Le Presidente Luanda Hotel is a hotel in Luanda, Angola, considered to be the city's most prestigious hotel. Opened in 1960, as of 2015 it had 194 rooms. Over the years it has played a major role in Angolan international relations, and is a common meeting place for ambassadors, politicians and business executives. After undergoing inspection in 1980, the hotel subsequently underwent restoration the following year. As of 1995 it had only one of two foreign exchange points in the city, the other being at the Banco Nacional de Angola.
