= João Ernesto dos Santos =

Angolan politician

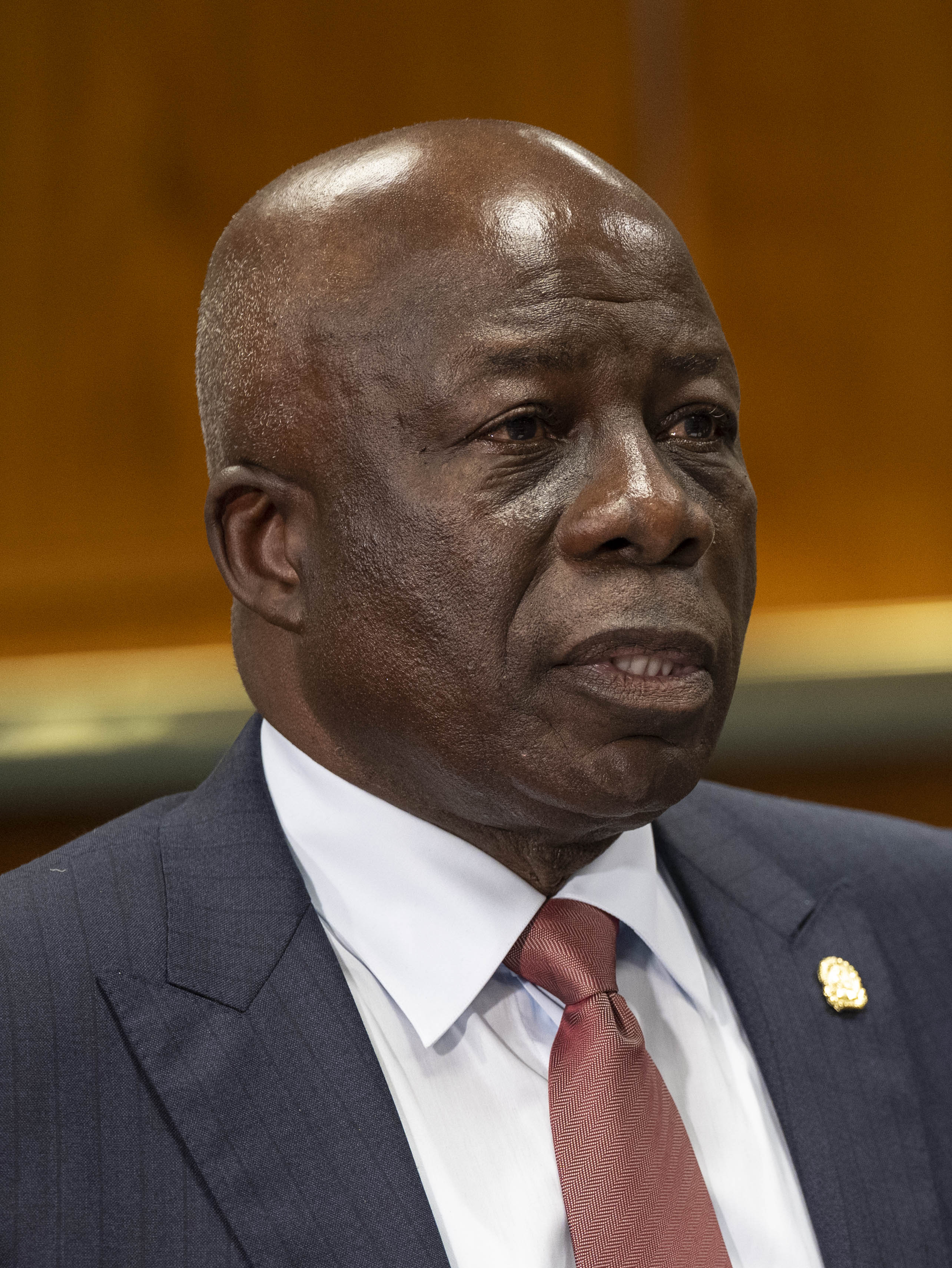
João Ernesto dos Santos in 2024

João Ernesto dos Santos is an Angolan politician and cabinet minister who is serving as Minister of National Defence and served as Former Governor of Moxico Province.

== Personal life ==
He was born in January 15, 1954.
