= Pedro Pedalé =

Angolan politician

Pedro Maria Tonha Pedalé (Cabinda, 7 July 1943 — London, 22 July 1995) was the Angolan minister for defence in the 1994 government of Jose Eduardo dos Santos.
