= Ministry of National Defence and Homeland Veterans (Angola) =

Government ministry of Angola

The Ministry of National Defence and Homeland Veterans (Portuguese: Ministro da Defesa Nacional e Veteranos da Pátria) is an executive agency of the Government of Angola that controls the Angolan Armed Forces. It is based at Rua 17 de Setembro in Luanda.

== Name changes ==
- 1975–1995: Ministry of Defence
- 1996–present: Ministry of National Defence

== Structure ==
- Military Affairs Cabinet ("Casa Militar"), headed by one of the three Ministers of State and answers directly to the Office of the President.

== Minister of National Defence ==
The Minister of National Defence of Angola is a cabinet level position in the national government. The minister is responsible for the entire defense establishment. The position was established in 1975 with Henrique Teles Carreira as the inaugural minister.

=== List ===
- 1975–1979: Gen. Henrique Teles Carreira
- 1980–1995: Gen. Pedro Pedalé
- 1995–1999: Gen. Pedro Sebastião
- 1999–2010: Gen. Kundi Paihama
- 2010–2014: Gen. Cândido Pereira dos Santos Van-Dúnem
- 2014–2017: Gen. João Manuel Gonçalves Lourenço
- 2017–2020: Gen. Salviano de Jesus Sequeira
- 2020–present: Gen. João Ernesto dos Santos

=== Deputies ===
The commanders of the three major military services each held the title of vice minister of defence.
