= Angolan Army =

- Exército Angolano
- Active: 1 August 1974; 51 years ago
- Country: Angola
- Type: Army
- Role: Land warfare
- Size: 100,000
- Part of: Angolan Armed Forces
- Garrison/HQ: Luanda

Commanders
- Current commander: General Jaque Raúl
- Notable commanders: General Gouveia João de Sá Miranda

The Angolan Army (Portuguese: Exército Angolano) is the land component of the Angolan Armed Forces (FAA).

== History ==
On August 1, 1974, a few months after a military coup d'état had overthrown the Lisbon regime and proclaimed its intention of granting independence to Angola, the MPLA announced the formation of FAPLA, which replaced the EPLA. By 1976 FAPLA had been transformed from lightly armed guerrilla units into a national army capable of sustained field operations.

In 1990–91, the Army had ten military regions and an estimated 73+ 'brigades', each with a mean strength of 1,000 and comprising inf, tank, APC, artillery, and AA units as required. The Library of Congress said in 1990 that '[t]he regular army's 91,500 troops were organized into more than seventy brigades ranging from 750 to 1,200 men each and deployed throughout the ten military regions. Most regions were commanded by lieutenant colonels, with majors as deputy commanders, but some regions were commanded by majors. Each region consisted of one to four provinces, with one or more infantry brigades assigned to it. The brigades were generally dispersed in battalion or smaller unit formations to protect strategic terrain, urban centers, settlements, and critical infrastructure such as bridges and factories. Counterintelligence agents were assigned to all field units to thwart UNITA infiltration. The army's diverse combat capabilities were indicated by its many regular and motorised infantry brigades with organic or attached armor, artillery, and air defense units; two militia infantry brigades; four antiaircraft artillery brigades; ten tank battalions; and six artillery battalions. These forces were concentrated most heavily in places of strategic importance and recurring conflict: the oil-producing Cabinda Province, the area around the capital, and the southern provinces where UNITA and South African forces operated.

In 2014 Luzia Inglês Van-Dúnem became the first Angolan woman to be promoted to the post of General Officer of the Angolan Armed Forces; the promotion was decreed by President José Eduardo dos Santos.

== Structure ==
Angola has six Military Regions:

- Cabinda Military Region (Cabinda)
- Luanda Military Region (Luanda)
- Northern Military Region (Uíge, Zaire, Cuanza-Norte, Bengo, and Malanje)
- Central Military Region (Huambo, Bié, Benguela, and Cuanza Sul)
- Eastern Military Region (Moxico, Lunda Sul, and Lunda Norte)
- Southern Military Region (Huíla, Namibe, Cunene, and Cuando Cubango)

It was reported on May 3, 2007, that the Special Forces Brigade of the Angolan Armed Forces (FAA) located at Cabo Ledo region, northern Bengo Province, would host a 29th anniversary celebration for the entire armed forces. The brigade was reportedly formed on May 5, 1978, and under the command at the time of Colonel Paulo Falcao.

As of 2011, the IISS reported the ground forces had 42 armoured/infantry regiments ('detachments/groups - strength varies') and 16 infantry 'brigades'. These probably comprised infantry, tanks, APC, artillery, and AA units as required. Major equipment included over 140 main battle tanks, 600 reconnaissance vehicles, over 920 AFVs, infantry fighting vehicles, 298 howitzers.

In 2013, the International Institute for Strategic Studies reported that the FAA had six divisions, the 1st, 5th, and 6th with two or three infantry brigades, and the 2nd, 3rd, and 4th with five to six infantry brigades. The 4th Division included a tank regiment. A separate tank brigade and special forces brigade were also reported.

== Equipment ==
The Army operates a large amount of Russian, Soviet and ex-Warsaw pact hardware. A large amount of its equipment was acquired in the 1980s and 1990s most likely because of hostilities with neighbouring countries and its civil war which lasted from November 1975 until 2002. There is an interest from the Angolan Army for the Brazilian ASTROS II multiple rocket launcher.

=== Infantry weapons ===
Many of Angola's weapons are of Portuguese colonial and Warsaw Pact origin. Jane's Information Group lists the following as in service:

- Rifles in service with Army include the AK-47, AKM, FN FAL, G3 Assault Rifle, SKS and IMI Tavor.
- Pistols include the Makarov pistol, Stechkin automatic pistol and the Tokarev TT pistol.
- Submachine guns include the Škorpion vz. 61, Star Z-45, Uzi and the FBP submachine gun.
- Machine guns include the RP-46, RPD machine gun, Vz. 52 machine gun and the DShK Heavy machine gun.
- Grenade launchers include the AGS-17 automatic grenade launcher.
- Mortars include the 120-PM-43 mortar (500 in service) and the 82-PM-41 (250 in service).
- Anti-Tank weapons include the RPG-7, 9K11 Malyutka, B-10 recoilless rifle and the B-11 recoilless rifle.

=== Main battle tanks ===
- Between 116 and 267 T-55AM-2 Medium tanks. 281 T-55's were ordered between 1975 and 1999. 267 T-55AM-2's were delivered from Bulgaria and Slovakia in 1999.
- 50 T-72M1 main battle tanks. Delivered from Belarus in 1999.
- 50 T-62 Main battle tanks. 364 were ordered in the 1980s and 1990s.
- 12 PT-76 Amphibious Light tanks. 68 ordered in 1975 from the Soviet Union.

=== Armoured vehicles ===
- 150 BMP-1 infantry fighting vehicles.
- 100 BMP-2 infantry fighting vehicles.
- 195 BRDM-2 Amphibious Armoured Scout Cars.
- 62 BTR-60 armored personnel carriers
- 45 Casspir NG 2000B Infantry mobility vehicles
- 24 EE-11 Urutu armored personnel carriers

=== Artillery ===
- 12 2S1 Gvozdika 122 mm Self-propelled guns (Acquired in 2000 from the Czech Republic).
- 4 2S3 Akatsiya 152 mm Self-propelled guns (Acquired in 1999 from the Bulgaria).
- 12 2S7 Pion 203 mm Self-propelled guns (Acquired in 2000 from the Czech Republic).
- ~280 D-30 122 mm Howitzers (28 from Kazakhstan in 1998, 12 from Belarus, 240 from the Soviet Union in the 1980s)
- 4 D-20 Howitzers.
- Unknown amounts of 85 mm divisional gun D-44 Field Guns.
- 48 M-46 130 mm field guns
- 75 BM-21 Grad multiple rocket launchers
- 40 RM-70 multiple rocket launchers

=== Anti-aircraft weaponry ===
- 20 ZSU-23-4 Shilka Self-propelled anti-aircraft guns.
- Unknown amounts of ZU-23-2, 57 mm AZP S-60, M-1939, and ZPU-4 anti-aircraft guns.
- 40 SA-2 Guideline high-altitude air defense systems.
- 12 SA-3 Goa
- 25 SA-6
- Unknown amounts of SA-7 Grail
- 15 SA-8
- 20 SA-9 Gaskin
- 10 SA-13
- Unknown amounts of SA-14 Gremlin and SA-16 Gimlet.

=== Other vehicles ===
- Star 266
- KrAZ-6322
