= Angolan Navy =

Navy of Angola
- Marinha De Guerra Angolana
- Founded: 11 November 1975; 50 years ago
- Country: Angola
- Type: Navy
- Role: Naval warfare
- Size: 1,000 personnel, plus 500 marines; 31 Ships
- Part of: Angolan Armed Forces
- Headquarters: Luanda
- Engagements: Angolan Civil War

Commanders
- Commander-in-Chief: President João Lourenço

The Angolan Navy (Portuguese: Marinha de Guerra Angolana) or MGA is the naval branch of the Angolan Armed Forces and is tasked with protecting Angola's 1,600 km long coastline. The Angolan Navy has approximately 1,000 personnel plus 500 marines.

== History ==
The Angolan Navy was officially founded on 10 July 1976, though it traces its origins to 11 November 1975 when Angolans took over naval facilities abandoned by the Portuguese Navy. The first personnel to serve in the Navy were MPLA militants who received some training in the Soviet Union and starting in 1976, Cuban-trained volunteers were also incorporated. Initially the fleet had twelve ex-Portuguese patrol boats, landing ships, and speedboats. In 1977, the Soviets transferred five Shershen-class torpedo boats and Osa-class missile boats.

Angolan Navy forces participated in the Angolan Civil War. Despite increasing in size to 2,700 personnel (split in two brigades) with Soviet assistance, the Navy remained a small, neglected branch of the Angolan Armed Forces, with combat ships inferior in capability in comparison to the fast missile boats operated by the South African Navy and unable to respond to South African raids on its coasts.

Despite the presence of the Soviet Navy 30th Operational Squadron in Luanda, including Tu-95RT reconnaissance aircraft, the South African Navy frequently conducted raids against oil facilities, roads, and railways with the UNITA claiming responsibility for these attacks, giving South Africa a veneer of plausible deniability.

Training and maintenance were largely dependent of the Soviet and Cuban assistance. After the independence of Angola, a small team of Portuguese instructors remained in the country, while a Nigerian team cooperated with the Cuban and Soviet advisors in the late 1980s.

In 1991, the Angolan Navy had 1,250 personnel plus ten fast attack craft, seven patrol craft, two coastal minehunters, thirteen landing craft and three auxiliary ships, most of the fleet was non-operational. While Angola had some minor repair facilities in Luanda and Lobito, maintenance was still dependent on Soviet-trained technicians. In 1996, after the end of Soviet support, most ships were left in "various states of terminal decay" and as result, the fleet was reduced to four Spanish-built patrol boats, three French-built coastal patrol boats, and two ex-Soviet minehunters. The latter were only used for patrol duties. In 2004, the Angolan Navy had only 800 personnel and no operational ships.

== Twenty-first century ==
Angola's oil wealth allowed it to rebuild its navy. It was reported in 2009 that Angola was hoping to sign a US$800m deal with Germany for 3 new border protection Fast Attack Craft, probably Lurssen PV80's. They were still trying to complete the deal in 2011 and there has been no word on it since.

In December 2013 it was reported that Angola would be buying a package of old ships from the Spanish Navy. Príncipe de Asturias (R11) a small (16,000t) Harrier carrier, to be transferred along with Pizarro (L42) a Newport class landing ship, Diana (F32) a Descubierta class corvette converted to minesweeper support ship, Chilreu (P61) lead ship of its class of ocean patrol vessels, and Ízaro (P27) an Anaga class patrol ship. This deal never came to pass.

The Angolan Government contracted a EURO 1 Billion contract that was signed in 2021 to modernize their Navy. The EDGE Group, a UAE based defence conglomerate compromising of 25 companies are the selected supplier. The EDGE Group will construct three advanced 71-meter light corvettes for the Angolan Navy as well as a number of inshore patrol vessels and transport ships, incorporating technology from the French Constructions Mécaniques de Normandie shipyard. An integrated logistic support package is included in the deal. Two will be manufactured in Cherbourg and one in Abu Dhabi. These ships will be some of the most advanced warships in their class in Africa.

The corvettes are the proven Baynunah-class corvette (Mark II variant of the BR71 MKI design), which is currently in service with the United Arab Emirates Navy. On or about March 7, 2026, the lead corvette was launched. Sea trials and final customer delivery expected in October 2026. CMN has already delivered two 70 metre LCT-2000 landing craft, three Ocean Eagle 43 patrol and support vessels to Angola.

In 2023, the Angolan Navy took possession of a new Portuguese-built naval base at Soyo. The base is larger than the Angolan Navy's primary facilities in Luanda.

== Structure ==
- Naval War Institute (INSG)
- Naval Academy
- Naval Specialist School
- 3 Coastal Surveillance Companies (CRTOC)
- 1 Naval Infantry Unit - 1 Light Amphibious Battalion (4 Marine Companies, 1 Naval Police Unit, 1 Amphibious Operations Unit)
- Special Forces, heavy weapons, snipers, boarding units, and an armored section.

== Equipment ==
=== Current inventory ===
Name	Builder	Quantity	Notes
Patrol boat
Ngola Kiluange	Damen Shipyards Group	2	Used by the Ministry of Fisheries.
Rei Bula Matadi		5	Used by the Ministry of Fisheries.
HSI 32	Constructions Mécaniques de Normandie (CMN)	3	
PVC-170	Aresa Shipyard	5	
Super Dvora Mk III	Israel Aerospace Industries	4	
Mandume	Bazán Shipyard	4	
Ocean Eagle 43	CMN	1	
Comandante Imperial Santana		5	Used by the Ministry of Fisheries.
Landing craft
RA 4 de Abril	CMN	1	1 on order.
Auxiliary ship
Baía Farta	Damen Shipyards Group	1	Research vessel, used by the Ministry of Fisheries.
Anti-ship missile
4K44 Utyos			Based at Luanda.

=== Former inventory ===
Former ships operated by the Angolan Navy includes: six ex-Soviet Osa II-class missile boats, four ex-Soviet Shershen-class torpedo boats, five ex-Portuguese Argos-class patrol boats, one ex-Soviet Zhuk-class patrol boat, two ex-Portuguese Jupiter-class patrol boats, two ex-Soviet Poluchat I-class patrol boats, four ex-Portuguese Bellatrix-class patrol boats, three French-built Patrulheiro-class patrol boats, three ex-Soviet Polnocny B-class landing ships, one ex-Portuguese Alfange-class landing ship, and two ex-Soviet Yevgenya-class minesweepers.

== Ranks ==
=== Commissioned officer ranks ===
The rank insignia of commissioned officers.

Rank group	General / flag officers				Senior officers			Junior officers
Angolan Navy
Angolan Navy	Almirante-da-Armada	Almirante	Vice-almirante	Contra-almirante	Capitão-de-mar-e-guerra	Capitão-de-fragata	Capitão-de-corveta	Tenente-de-navio	Tenente-de-fragata	Tenente-de-corveta

=== Other ranks ===
The rank insignia of non-commissioned officers and enlisted personnel.

Rank group	Senior NCOs					Junior NCOs	Enlisted
Angolan Navy									No insignia
Angolan Navy	Sargento-mor	Sargento-chefe	Sargento-ajudante	Primeiro-sargento	Segundo-sargento	Sub-sargento	Cabo	Marinheiro	Grumete

== Bibliography ==
- Fontanellaz, Adrien; Cooper, Tom; Matos, José Augusto (2021). War of Intervention in Angola: Volume 4 - Angolan and Cuban Air Forces, 1985-1987. Helion and Company. ISBN 978-1-80451-096-4.
- International Institute for Strategic Studies (11 February 2025). "Chapter Eight: Sub-Saharan Africa". The Military Balance. 125 (1). Taylor & Francis: 440–509. doi:10.1080/04597222.2025.2445480.
- Moore, Capt. John, ed. (1987). Jane's Fighting Ships 1987–88 (90th ed.). London: Jane's Publishing Company. ISBN 0-7106-0842-X.
- Sharpe, Capt. Richard, ed. (1991). Jane's Fighting Ships 1991–92 (94th ed.). Surrey: Jane's Information Group. ISBN 0-7106-0960-4.
- Sharpe, Capt. Richard, ed. (1996). Jane's Fighting Ships 1996–97 (99th ed.). Surrey: Jane's Information Group. ISBN 0-7106-1355-5.
- Saunders, Commodore Stephen, ed. (2004). Jane's Fighting Ships 2004-2005 (107th ed.). Surrey: Jane's Information Group. ISBN 0-7106-2623-1.
